= Sensory neuroscience =

Field of neuroscience relating to the senses

Sensory neuroscience is a subfield of neuroscience which explores the anatomy and physiology of neurons that are part of sensory systems such as vision, hearing, and olfaction. Neurons in sensory regions of the brain respond to stimuli by firing one or more nerve impulses (action potentials) following stimulus presentation. How is information about the outside world encoded by the rate, timing, and pattern of action potentials? This so-called neural code is currently poorly understood and sensory neuroscience plays an important role in the attempt to decipher it. Looking at early sensory processing is advantageous since brain regions that are "higher up" (e.g. those involved in memory or emotion) contain neurons which encode more abstract representations. However, the hope is that there are unifying principles which govern how the brain encodes and processes information. Studying sensory systems is an important stepping stone in our understanding of brain function in general.

== Typical experiments ==
A typical experiment in sensory neuroscience involves the presentation of a series of relevant stimuli to an experimental subject while the subject's brain is being monitored. This monitoring can be accomplished by noninvasive means such as functional magnetic resonance imaging (fMRI) or electroencephalography (EEG), or by more invasive means such as electrophysiology, the use of electrodes to record the electrical activity of single neurons or groups of neurons. fMRI measures changes in blood flow which related to the level of neural activity and provides low spatial and temporal resolution, but does provide data from the whole brain. In contrast, Electrophysiology provides very high temporal resolution (the shapes of single spikes can be resolved) and data can be obtained from single cells. This is important since computations are performed within the dendrites of individual neurons.

=== Single neuron experiments ===
In most of the central nervous system, neurons communicate exclusively by sending each other action potentials, colloquially known as "spikes". It is therefore thought that all of the information a sensory neuron encodes about the outside world can be inferred by the pattern of its spikes. Current experimental techniques cannot measure individual spikes noninvasively. Such encoding includes the Dual Process Theory and how we think in a conscious and unconscious manner.

A typical single neuron experiment will consist of isolating a neuron (that is, navigating the neuron until the experimenter finds a neuron which spikes in response to the type of stimulus to be presented, and (optionally) determining that all of the spikes observed indeed come from a single neuron), then presenting a stimulus protocol. Because neural responses are inherently variable (that is, their spiking pattern may depend on more than just the stimulus which is presented, although not all of this variability may be true noise, since factors other than the presented stimulus may affect the sensory neuron under study), often the same stimulus protocol is repeated many times to get a feel for the variability a neuron may have. One common analysis technique is to study the neuron's average time-varying firing rate, called its post stimulus time histogram or PSTH.

== Receptive field estimation ==
One major goal of sensory neuroscience is to try to estimate the neuron's receptive field; that is, to try to determine which stimuli cause the neuron to fire in what ways. One common way to find the receptive field is to use linear regression to find which stimulus characteristics typically caused neurons to become excited or depressed. Since the receptive field of a sensory neuron can vary in time (i.e. latency between the stimulus and the effect it has on the neuron) and in some spatial dimension (literally space for vision and somatosensory cells, but other "spatial" dimensions such as the frequency of a sound for auditory neurons), the term spatio temporal receptive field or STRF is often used to describe these receptive fields.

=== Natural stimuli ===
One recent trend in sensory neuroscience has been the adoption of natural stimuli for the characterization of sensory neurons. There is good reason to believe that there has been evolutionary pressure on sensory systems to be able to represent natural stimuli well, so sensory systems may exhibit the most relevant behaviour in response to natural stimuli. The adoption of natural stimuli in sensory neuroscience has been slowed by the fact that the mathematical descriptions of natural stimuli tend to be more complex than of simplified artificial stimuli such as simple tones or clicks in audition or line patterns in vision. Free software is now available to help neuroscientists interested in estimating receptive fields cope with the difficulty of using natural stimuli.

Sensory neuroscience is also used as a bottom-up approach to studying consciousness. For example, visual sense and representation has been studied by Crick and Koch (1998), and experiments have been suggested in order to test various hypotheses in this research stream.

== See also ==
- Efficient coding hypothesis
- Multisensory integration
