= Surround suppression =

Surround suppression is where the relative firing rate of a neuron may under certain conditions decrease when a particular stimulus is enlarged. It has been observed in electrophysiology studies of the brain and has been noted in many sensory neurons, most notably in the early visual system. Surround suppression is defined as a reduction in the activity of a neuron in response to a stimulus outside its classical receptive field.

The necessary functional connections with other neurons influenced by stimulation outside a particular area and by dynamic processes in general, and the absence of a theoretical description of a system state to be treated as a baseline, deprive the term "classical receptive field" of functional meaning. The descriptor "surround suppression" suffers from a similar problem, as the activities of neurons in the "surround" of the "classical receptive field are similarly determined by connectivities and processes involving neurons beyond it.) This nonlinear effect is one of many that reveals the complexity of biological sensory systems, and the connections of properties of neurons that may cause this effect (or its opposite) are still being studied. The characteristics, mechanisms, and perceptual consequences of this phenomenon are of interest to many communities, including neurobiology, computational neuroscience, psychology, and computer vision.

== Background ==
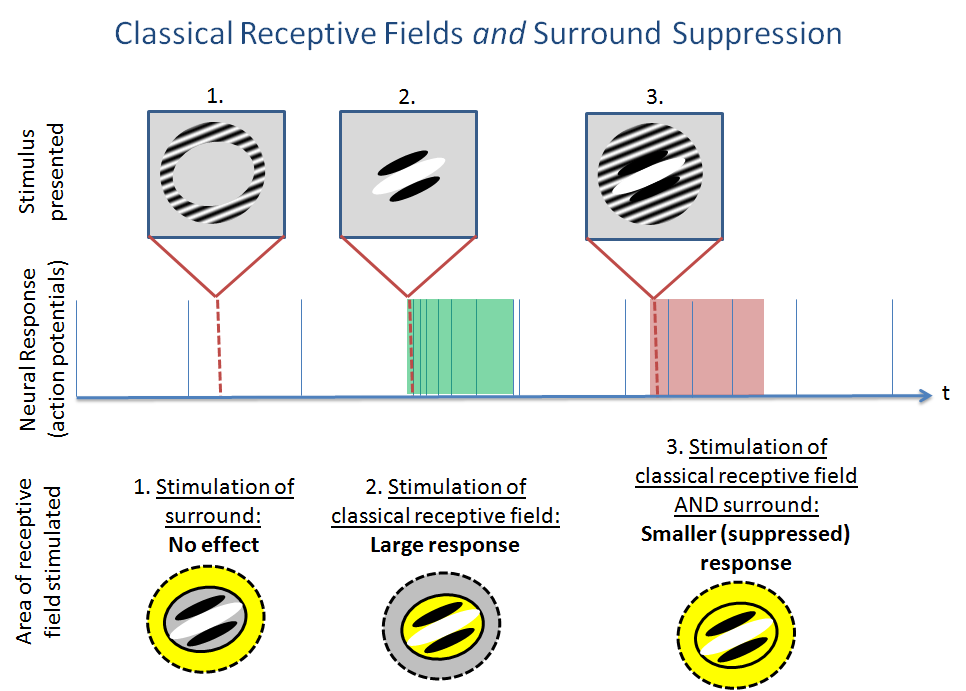
Stimulation of the surround with the classical receptive field induces a response that is smaller than stimulation of the classical receptive field alone. Stimulation of the surround only has no effect.

The classical model of early vision presumes that each neuron responds independently to a specific stimulus in a localized area of the visual field. (According to Carandini et al (2005), this computational model, which may be fit to various datasets, "degrade[s] quickly if we change almost any aspect of the test stimulus.") The stimulus and corresponding location in the visual field are collectively called the classical receptive field. However, not all effects can be explained by via ad hoc independent filters. Surround suppression is one of an infinite number of possible effects in which neurons do not behave according to the classical model. These effects are collectively called non-classical receptive field effects, and have recently become a substantial research area in vision and other sensory systems.

During surround suppression, neurons are inhibited by a stimulus outside their classical receptive field, in an area loosely termed deemed the 'surround.'

== Characteristics: effects on neural responses ==
=== Electrophysiology studies ===
Electrophysiology studies are used to characterize the surround suppression effect. Vision researchers that record neural activity in the primary visual cortex (V1) have seen that spike rates, or neural responses, can be suppressed in as many as 90% of neurons by stimuli outside of their surround. In these cells, the spike rates may be reduced by as much as 70%.

=== Stimulus and attention dependence ===
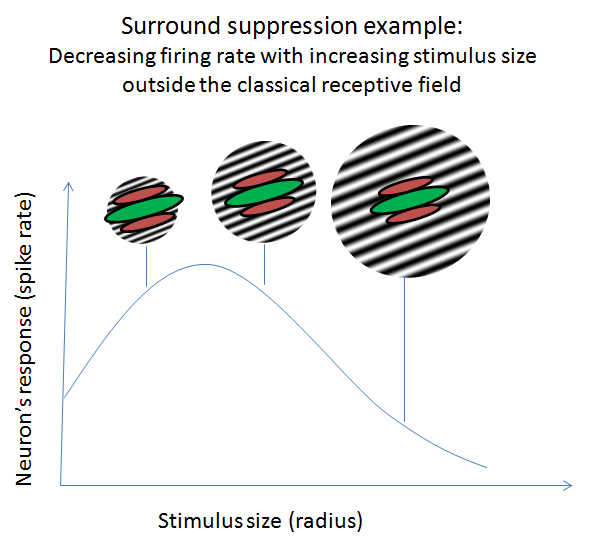
Suppression often increases with stimulus size beyond the classical receptive field.

The suppressive effect is often dependent on the contrast, orientation, and direction of motion of the stimulus stimulating the surround. These properties are highly dependent on the brain area and the individual neuron being studied. In MT, for instance, cells can be sensitive to the direction and velocity of stimuli up to 50 to 100 times the area of their classical receptive fields. The statistical properties of the stimuli used to probe these neurons affect the properties of the surround as well. Because these areas are so highly interconnected, stimulation of one cell can affect the response properties of other cells, and therefore researchers have become increasingly aware of the choice of stimuli they use in these experiments. In addition to studies with simple stimuli (dots, bars, sinusoidal gratings), more recent studies have used more realistic stimuli (natural scenes) to study these effects. Stimuli that better represent natural scenes tend to induce higher levels of suppression, indicating this effect is tied closely to the properties of natural scenes such as textures and local context.

Surround suppression is also modulated by attention. By training monkeys to attend to certain areas of their visual field, researchers have studied how directed attention can enhance the suppressive effects of stimuli surrounding the area of attention. Similar perceptual studies have been performed on human subjects as well.

=== Systems involved ===
Surround suppression was formally discovered in the visual pathway, being noticed first by Hubel and Wiesel while mapping receptive fields. The earliest parts of the visual pathway: the retina, Lateral Geniculate Nucleus (LGN), and primary visual cortex (V1) are among the most well-studied. Surround suppression has been studied in later areas as well, including V2, V3, V4, and MT.

Surround suppression has also been seen in sensory systems other than vision. One example in somatosensation is surround suppression in the barrel cortex of mice, in which bending one whisker can suppress the response of a neuron responding to a whisker nearby. It has even been seen in the frequency response properties of electoreception in electric fish.

== Biological mechanisms ==
The biological mechanisms behind surround suppression are not known.

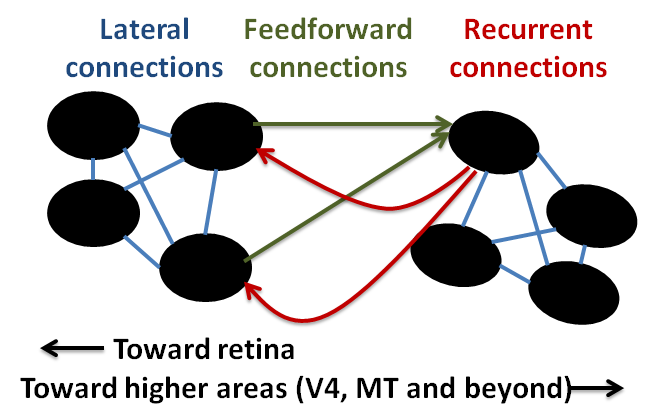
The differences between lateral, feedforward, and recurrent connections

Several theories have been proposed for the biological basis of this effect. Based on the diversity of the stimulus characteristics that cause this effect and the variety of responses that are generated, it seems that many mechanisms may be at play.

=== Lateral connections ===
Lateral connections are connections between neurons in the same layer. There are many of these connections in all areas of the visual system, which means that a neuron representing one piece of the visual field can influence a neuron representing another piece. Even within lateral connections, there are potentially different mechanisms at play. Monocular mechanisms, requiring stimulation in only one eye, may drive this effect with stimuli with high spatial frequency. When the stimulus frequency is lowered, however, binocular mechanisms come into play, where neurons from different eyes may suppress each other. Model based on this idea have been shown to reproduce surround suppressive effects.

=== Recurrent feedback ===
It has been posited that lateral connections are too slow and cover too little of the visual field to fully explain surround suppression. Feedback from higher areas may explain the discrepancies seen in mechanism for surround suppression based purely on lateral connections. There is evidence that inactivation of higher order areas results in reduced strength of surround suppression. At least one model of excitatory connections from higher levels has been formed in the effort to more fully explain surround suppression. However, recurrent feedback is difficult to determine using electrophysiology, and the potential mechanisms at play are not as well studied as feedforward or lateral connections.

== Advantages ==
Surround suppression behavior (and its opposite) gives the sensory system several advantages from both a perceptual and information theory standpoint.

=== Perceptual advantages ===
Surround suppression likely participates in context-dependent perceptual tasks. Some specific tasks in which surround suppression may aid include:

- Motion and velocity detection: In areas such as MT and even V1, the selectivity of neurons to the motion of contrasts may play a potential role in representing the structure of moving objects.
- Contour integration: Detecting continuity of curved and/or 'broken' edges
- Texture segregation
- Perceptual constancies: Recognizing continuity in objects despite changes in lighting, color, or size.
- Figure-ground segmentation: In this process, local contrast must be used to identify and assign borders.
- Depth perception (through motion parallax)

These tasks require the use of inputs over wide regions of visual space, meaning that independent responses to small parts of the visual field (a classical linear model of V1) would not be able to produce these effects. There is evidence that surround suppression participates in these tasks by either adjusting the representation of the classical receptive field or representing entirely different features that include both the classical receptive field and the surround. Direct comparison between physiology and psychophysical experiments have been done on several perceptual effects. These include: (1) the reduced apparent contrast of a grating texture embedded in a surrounding grating, (2) target identification when flanked by other features, (3) saliency of broken contours surrounded by edge segments of different orientations, and (4) orientation discrimination when surrounded by features of different orientations and spatial frequencies.

=== Information theoretic advantages ===
It has recently been shown that stimulation of the surround may support the efficient coding hypothesis proposed by Horace Barlow in 1961. This hypothesis suggests that the goal of the sensory system is to create an efficient representation of the stimulus. Recently, this has intersected with the idea of a 'sparse' code, one that is represented using the fewest units possible. It has been shown that surround suppression increases the efficiency of transmitting visual information, and may form a sparse code. If many cells respond to parts of the same stimulus, for instance, a lot of redundant information is encoded. The cell needs metabolic energy for each action potential it produces. Therefore, surround suppression likely helps to produce a neural code that is more metabolically efficient. There are additional theoretical advantages, including the removal of statistical redundancy inherent in natural scene statistics, as well as decorrelation of neural responses, which means less information to process later in the pathway.

== Related approaches in computer vision ==
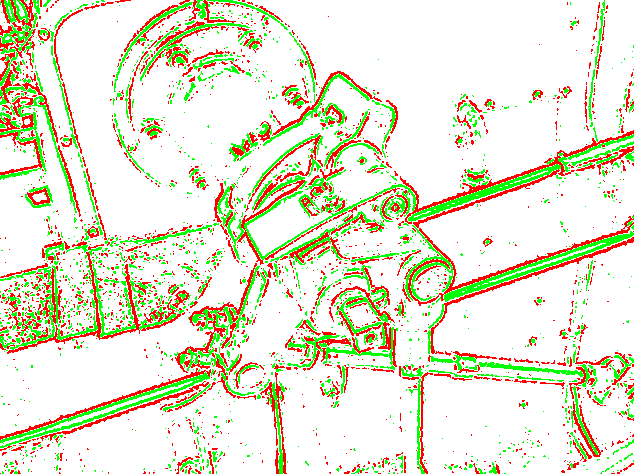
Edge detection based on center (red) and off center (green) receptive fields

The goal of computer vision is to perform automated tasks similar to those of the human visual system, quickly and accurately interpreting the world and making decisions based on visual information. Because surround suppression seems to play a role in efficient and accurate perception, there have been a few computer vision algorithms inspired by this phenomenon in human vision:

- Efficient image representation
- Contour detection algorithm
- Convolutional neural network

So far, the scientific community has been focused on the response properties of the neurons, but exploration of the relation to inference and learning has begun as well.
