= F-I curve =

Neuroscience concept

In neuroscience, a frequency-current curve (fI or F-I curve) is the function that relates the net synaptic current (I) flowing into a neuron to its firing rate (F) Because the f-I curve only specifies the firing rate rather than exact spike times, it is a concept suited to the rate coding rather than temporal coding model of neuronal computation. Common mathematical models for f-I include the sigmoid, exponential, and rectified linear functions.

The experimental study of how neuronal firing rates can relate to applied currents goes back at least as far as Hodgkin.
