= Hypercomplex =

Hypercomplex may refer to:

== Biology ==
- Hypercomplex cell

== Mathematics ==
- Hypercomplex analysis
- Hypercomplex manifold
- Hypercomplex number
