= Karen Moxon =

Karen Anne Moxon
- Education: University of Colorado Boulder; University of Michigan
- Known for: First demonstration of a closed-loop, real-time brain-machine interface system
- Scientific career
- Fields: Neurorobotics, Theoretical Neuroscience
- Workplaces: University of California, Davis

Karen Anne Moxon is a Professor of Bioengineering at University of California, Davis and a specialist in brain-machine-interfaces. She is best known for her neural engineering work, and is responsible for the first demonstration of a closed-loop, real-time brain machine interface system in rodent subjects, which was later translated to both non-human primates and humans with neurological disorders. She currently runs the Moxon Neurorobotics Laboratory at the University of California, Davis.

== Biography ==
She was born and raised on Long Island, and completed her undergraduate education studying chemical engineering at the University of Michigan. She completed her graduate studies at the University of Colorado Boulder, earning a master's degree in systems engineering and a Doctorate of Philosophy in aerospace engineering in 1991 and 1994, respectively. She then became an associate professor at Drexel University in Philadelphia, Pennsylvania. She ultimately rose to the position of associate director for research before leaving to lead research in the Bioengineering Department at University of California, Davis.

At Davis, she assumed a leadership role over a five year international research initiative that was awarded a $36 million grant by DARPA as part of its Bridging the Gap Plus program.

== Public profile ==
In 2015, she was a speaker at the 7th International Institute of Electrical and Electronics Engineers EMBS Symposium on the Future of Brain Machine Interfaces. Her research on cortex-dependent recovery of unassisted hindlimb locomotion in rats was the subject of a 2017 Nature highlight. Moxon was a guest on the Dana Foundation's Cerebrum podcast in 2019. In May 2020, she was a guest on Melinda Garvey's See It to Be It podcast.

== Select publications ==
- Chapin, John K.; Moxon, Karen A.; Markowitz, Ronald S.; Nicolelis, Miguel A. L. (1999-07). "Real-time control of a robot arm using simultaneously recorded neurons in the motor cortex". Nature Neuroscience. 2 (7): pages 664–670. doi:10.1038/10223. ISSN 1546-1726. (Cited 1443 times, according to Google Scholar)
- Talwar, Sanjiv K.; Xu, Shaohua; Hawley, Emerson S.; Weiss, Shennan A.; Moxon, Karen A.; Chapin, John K. (2002–05). "Rat navigation guided by remote control". Nature. 417 (6884): pages 37–38. doi:10.1038/417037a. ISSN 1476-4687. (Cited 461 times, according to Google Scholar.)
- Priori, A.; Foffani, G.; Pesenti, A.; Tamma, F.; Bianchi, A. M.; Pellegrini, M.; Locatelli, M.; Moxon, K. A.; Villani, R. M. (2004-10-01). "Rhythm-specific pharmacological modulation of subthalamic activity in Parkinson's disease". Experimental Neurology. 189 (2): pages 369–379. doi:10.1016/j.expneurol.2004.06.001. ISSN 0014-4886. (Cited 469 times, according to Google Scholar.)

== See also ==
- Neuralink
- Neuroprosthetics
