= Representational drift =

Gradual change of neural representation over time

In neuroscience, representational drift is a phenomenon describing the gradual change in how the brain represents information over time, even when the information (and associated perception or behavior) itself remains constant. This contrasts with the idea of stable neural representations, where the same information would ideally be encoded by consistent patterns of neural activity. Neural representations are the patterns of activity within networks of neurons that encode information. While stability is important for consistent recognition and recall, the brain's inherent plasticity and ongoing learning processes can lead to modifications in these representations. Representational drift manifests as these gradual shifts in the neural activity patterns associated with specific information. Over time, the same stimulus or concept might elicit a different, albeit potentially related, pattern of neural activation.

The underlying causes of representational drift are not fully understood, but several contributing factors are hypothesized. One prominent theory suggests that ongoing learning, even about familiar stimuli, continuously refines and updates neural representations. Synaptic plasticity, the dynamic strengthening and weakening of connections between neurons, is another likely contributor, as these changes can reshape the neural circuits involved in representing information. Furthermore, inherent noise within neural systems, including random fluctuations in neuronal firing, could also play a role in driving drift.
