= Yngve Zotterman =

Swedish neurophysiologist (1898–1982)

Yngve Zotterman (20 September 1898 in Vadstena – 13 March 1982 in Stockholm) was a Swedish neurophysiologist who received his medical training at the Karolinska Institute.

== Career ==
In 1940, Zotterman was appointed associate professor at the Karolinska Institute, and in 1946 he became professor and director of the departments of physiology and pharmacology at the Veterinary High School in Stockholm. He held that position until his retirement in 1965. In later years he worked at the Wenner-Gren Center in Stockholm and helped organise international symposia on olfaction and taste.

He conducted pioneering studies on nerve conduction together with Edgar Adrian. He then worked on sensory function of skin, particularly related to pain, heat and the neurochemistry of taste buds.

He was elected a member of the Royal Swedish Academy of Engineering Sciences in 1949, and of the Royal Swedish Academy of Sciences in 1953.

== Research ==
Working with Edgar Adrian at Cambridge in the 1920s, Zotterman helped to demonstrate that individual sensory nerve fibres encode stimulus intensity through changes in firing rate, work that became a classic in sensory physiology.

== See also ==
- Rate coding
