= Receptive field =

Delimited medium where some stimuli can evoke neuronal responses

In neuroscience, a receptive field or sensory space has been defined by Alonso and Chen as:

a portion of sensory space that can elicit neuronal responses when stimulated. The sensory space can be defined in a single dimension (e.g. carbon chain length of an odorant), two dimensions (e.g. skin surface), or multiple dimensions (e.g. space, time[,] and tuning properties of a visual receptive field). The neuronal response can be defined as firing rate (i.e. number of action potentials generated by a neuron) or include also subthreshold activity (i.e. depolarizations and hyperpolarizations in membrane potential that do not generate action potentials).

A sensory space can be dependent of an animal's location. For a particular sound wave traveling in an appropriate transmission medium, by means of sound localization, an auditory space would amount to a reference system that continuously shifts as the animal moves (taking into consideration the space inside the ears as well). Conversely, receptive fields can be largely independent of the animal's location, as in the case of place cells. A sensory space can also map into a particular region on an animal's body. For example, it could be a hair in the cochlea or a piece of skin, retina, or tongue or other part of an animal's body. Receptive fields have been identified for neurons of the auditory system, the somatosensory system, and the visual system.

The term receptive field was first used by Sherrington in 1906 to describe the area of skin from which a scratch reflex could be elicited in a dog. In 1938, Hartline started to apply the term to single neurons, this time from the frog retina.

This concept of receptive fields can be extended further up the nervous system. If many sensory receptors all form synapses with a single cell further up, they collectively form the receptive field of that cell. For example, the receptive field of a ganglion cell in the retina of the eye is composed of input from all of the photoreceptors which synapse with it, and a group of ganglion cells in turn forms the receptive field for a cell in the brain. This process is called convergence.

Receptive fields have been used in modern artificial deep neural networks that work with local operations.

== Auditory system ==
The auditory system processes the temporal and spectral (i.e. frequency) characteristics of sound waves, so the receptive fields of neurons in the auditory system are modeled as spectro-temporal patterns that cause the firing rate of the neuron to modulate with the auditory stimulus. Auditory receptive fields are often modeled as spectro-temporal receptive fields (STRFs), which are the specific pattern in the auditory domain that causes modulation of the firing rate of a neuron. Linear STRFs are created by first calculating a spectrogram of the acoustic stimulus, which determines how the spectral density of the acoustic stimulus changes over time, often using the Short-time Fourier transform (STFT). Firing rate is modeled over time for the neuron, possibly using a peristimulus time histogram if combining over multiple repetitions of the acoustic stimulus. Then, linear regression is used to predict the firing rate of that neuron as a weighted sum of the spectrogram. The weights learned by the linear model are the STRF, and represent the specific acoustic pattern that causes modulation in the firing rate of the neuron. STRFs can also be understood as the transfer function that maps an acoustic stimulus input to a firing rate response output. A theoretical explanation of the computational function of early auditory receptive fields is given in.

== Somatosensory system ==
In the somatosensory system, receptive fields are regions of the skin or of internal organs. Some types of mechanoreceptors have large receptive fields, while others have smaller ones.

Large receptive fields allow the cell to detect changes over a wider area, but lead to a less precise perception. Thus, the fingers, which require the ability to detect fine detail, have many, densely packed (up to 500 per cubic cm) mechanoreceptors with small receptive fields (around 10 square mm), while the back and legs, for example, have fewer receptors with large receptive fields. Receptors with large receptive fields usually have a "hot spot", an area within the receptive field (usually in the center, directly over the receptor) where stimulation produces the most intense response.

Tactile-sense-related cortical neurons have receptive fields on the skin that can be modified by experience or by injury to sensory nerves resulting in changes in the field's size and position. In general these neurons have relatively large receptive fields (much larger than those of dorsal root ganglion cells). However, the neurons are able to discriminate fine detail due to patterns of excitation and inhibition relative to the field which leads to spatial resolution.

== Visual system ==
In the visual system, receptive fields are volumes in visual space. They are smallest in the fovea where they can be a few minutes of arc like a dot on this page, to the whole page. For example, the receptive field of a single photoreceptor is a cone-shaped volume comprising all the visual directions in which light will alter the firing of that cell. Its apex is located in the center of the lens and its base essentially at infinity in visual space. Traditionally, visual receptive fields were portrayed in two dimensions (e.g., as circles, squares, or rectangles), but these are simply slices, cut along the screen on which the researcher presented the stimulus, of the volume of space to which a particular cell will respond. In the case of binocular neurons in the visual cortex, receptive fields do not extend to optical infinity. Instead, they are restricted to a certain interval of distance from the animal, or from where the eyes are fixating (see Panum's area).

The receptive field is often identified as the region of the retina where the action of light alters the firing of the neuron. In retinal ganglion cells (see below), this area of the retina would encompass all the photoreceptors, all the rods and cones from one eye that are connected to this particular ganglion cell via bipolar cells, horizontal cells, and amacrine cells. In binocular neurons in the visual cortex, it is necessary to specify the corresponding area in both retinas (one in each eye). Although these can be mapped separately in each retina by shutting one or the other eye, the full influence on the neuron's firing is revealed only when both eyes are open.

Hubel and Wiesel advanced the theory that receptive fields of cells at one level of the visual system are formed from input by cells at a lower level of the visual system. In this way, small, simple receptive fields could be combined to form large, complex receptive fields. Later theorists elaborated this simple, hierarchical arrangement by allowing cells at one level of the visual system to be influenced by feedback from higher levels.

Receptive fields have been mapped for all levels of the visual system from photoreceptors, to retinal ganglion cells, to lateral geniculate nucleus cells, to visual cortex cells, to extrastriate cortical cells. However, because the activities of neurons at any one location are contingent on the activities of neurons across the whole system, i.e. are contingent on changes in the whole field, it is unclear whether a local description of a particular "receptive field" can be considered a general description, robust to changes in the field as a whole. Studies based on perception do not give the full picture of the understanding of visual phenomena, so the electrophysiological tools must be used, as the retina, after all, is an outgrowth of the brain.

In retinal ganglion and V1 cells, the receptive field consists of the center and surround region.

=== Retinal ganglion cells ===
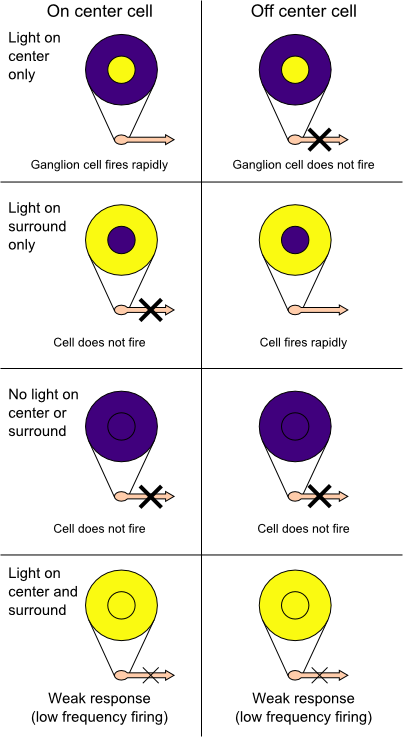
On center and off center retinal ganglion cells respond oppositely to light in the center and surround of their receptive fields. A strong response means high frequency firing, a weak response is firing at a low frequency, and no response means no action potential is fired.

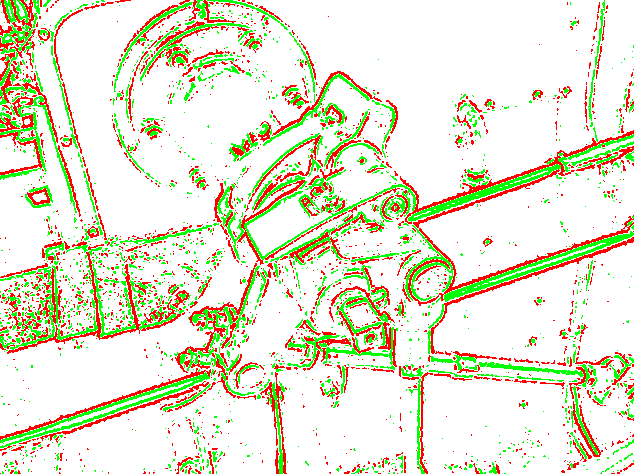
A computer emulation of "edge detection" using retinal receptive fields. On-centre and off-centre stimulation is shown in red and green respectively.

Each ganglion cell or optic nerve fiber bears a receptive field, increasing with intensifying light. In the largest field, the light has to be more intense at the periphery of the field than at the center, showing that some synaptic pathways are more preferred than others.

The organization of ganglion cells' receptive fields, composed of inputs from many rods and cones, provides a way of detecting contrast, and is used for detecting objects' edges. Each receptive field is arranged into a central disk, the "center", and a concentric ring, the "surround", each region responding oppositely to light. For example, light in the centre might increase the firing of a particular ganglion cell, whereas light in the surround would decrease the firing of that cell.

Stimulation of the center of an on-center cell's receptive field produces depolarization and an increase in the firing of the ganglion cell, stimulation of the surround produces a hyperpolarization and a decrease in the firing of the cell, and stimulation of both the center and surround produces only a mild response (due to mutual inhibition of center and surround). An off-center cell is stimulated by activation of the surround and inhibited by stimulation of the center (see figure).

Photoreceptors that are part of the receptive fields of more than one ganglion cell are able to excite or inhibit postsynaptic neurons because they release the neurotransmitter glutamate at their synapses, which can act to depolarize or to hyperpolarize a cell, depending on whether there is a metabotropic or ionotropic receptor on that cell.

The center-surround receptive field organization allows ganglion cells to transmit information not merely about whether photoreceptor cells are exposed to light, but also about the differences in firing rates of cells in the center and surround. This allows them to transmit information about contrast. The size of the receptive field governs the spatial frequency of the information: small receptive fields are stimulated by high spatial frequencies, fine detail; large receptive fields are stimulated by low spatial frequencies, coarse detail. Retinal ganglion cell receptive fields convey information about discontinuities in the distribution of light falling on the retina; these often specify the edges of objects. In dark adaptation, the peripheral opposite activity zone becomes inactive, but, since it is a diminishing of inhibition between center and periphery, the active field can actually increase, allowing more area for summation.

=== Lateral geniculate nucleus ===
Further along in the visual system, groups of ganglion cells form the receptive fields of cells in the lateral geniculate nucleus. Receptive fields are similar to those of ganglion cells, with an antagonistic center-surround system and cells that are either on- or off center.

=== Visual cortex ===
Receptive fields of cells in the visual cortex are larger and have more-complex stimulus requirements than retinal ganglion cells or lateral geniculate nucleus cells. Hubel and Wiesel (e.g., Hubel, 1963; Hubel-Wiesel 1959) classified receptive fields of cells in the visual cortex into simple cells, complex cells, and hypercomplex cells. Simple cell receptive fields are elongated, for example with an excitatory central oval, and an inhibitory surrounding region, or approximately rectangular, with one long side being excitatory and the other being inhibitory. Images for these receptive fields need to have a particular orientation in order to excite the cell. For complex-cell receptive fields, a correctly oriented bar of light might need to move in a particular direction in order to excite the cell. For hypercomplex receptive fields, the bar might also need to be of a particular length.

Original Organization of Visual Processing Cells by Hubel and Wiesel
Cell Type	Selectivity	Location
Simple	orientation, position	Brodmann area 17
Complex	orientation, motion, direction	Brodmann area 17 and 18
Hypercomplex	orientation, motion, direction, length	Brodmann areas 18 and 19

=== Extrastriate visual areas ===
In extrastriate visual areas, cells can have very large receptive fields requiring very complex images to excite the cell. For example, in the inferotemporal cortex, receptive fields cross the midline of visual space and require images such as radial gratings or hands. It is also believed that in the fusiform face area, images of faces excite the cortex more than other images. This property was one of the earliest major results obtained through fMRI (Kanwisher, McDermott and Chun, 1997); the finding was confirmed later at the neuronal level (Tsao, Freiwald, Tootell and Livingstone, 2006). In a similar vein, people have looked for other category-specific areas and found evidence for regions representing views of places (parahippocampal place area) and the body (Extrastriate body area). However, more recent research has suggested that the fusiform face area is specialised not just for faces, but also for any discrete, within-category discrimination.

=== Computational theory of visual receptive fields ===
A theoretical explanation of the computational function of visual receptive fields is given in. It is described how idealised models of receptive fields similar to the biological receptive fields found in the retina, the LGN and the primary visual cortex can be derived from structural properties of the environment in combination with internal consistency to guarantee consistent representation of image structures over multiple spatial and temporal scales. It is also described how the receptive fields in the primary visual cortex, which are tuned to different sizes, orientations and directions in the image domain, enable the visual system to handle the influence of natural image transformations and to compute invariant image representations at higher levels in the visual hierarchy.

An in-depth theoretical analysis of how the orientation selectivity of simple cells and complex cells in the primary visual cortex relate to inherent properties of visual receptive fields is given in.

== In the context of neural networks ==
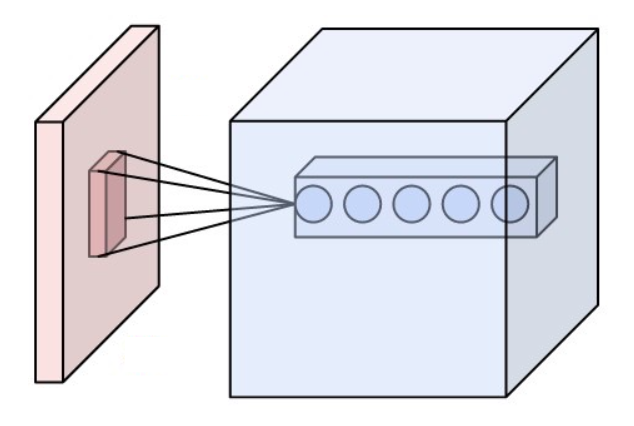
Neurons of a convolutional layer (blue), connected to their receptive field (red)

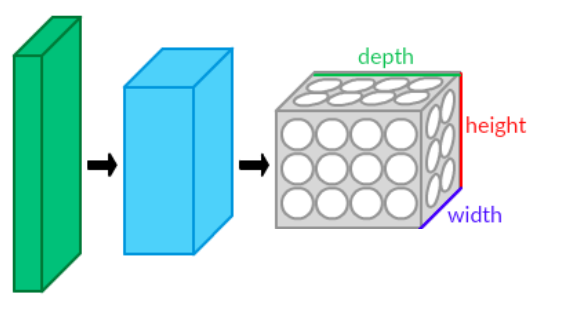
CNN layers arranged in three dimensions

The term receptive field is also used in the context of artificial neural networks, most often in relation to convolutional neural networks (CNNs). So, in a neural network context, the receptive field is defined as the size of the region in the input that produces the feature. Basically, it is a measure of association of an output feature (of any layer) to the input region (patch). The idea of receptive fields applies to local operations (i.e. convolution, pooling). As an example, in motion-based tasks, like video prediction and optical flow estimation, large motions need to be captured (displacements of pixels in a 2D grid), so an adequate receptive field is required. Specifically, the receptive field should be sufficient if it is larger than the largest flow magnitude of the dataset. There are a lot of ways that one can increase the receptive field on a CNN.

When used in this sense, the term adopts a meaning reminiscent of receptive fields in actual biological nervous systems. CNNs have a distinct architecture, designed to mimic the way in which real animal brains are understood to function; instead of having every neuron in each layer connect to all neurons in the next layer (Multilayer perceptron), the neurons are arranged in a 3-dimensional structure in such a way as to take into account the spatial relationships between different neurons with respect to the original data. Since CNNs are used primarily in the field of computer vision, the data that the neurons represent is typically an image; each input neuron represents one pixel from the original image. The first layer of neurons is composed of all the input neurons; neurons in the next layer will receive connections from some of the input neurons (pixels), but not all, as would be the case in a MLP and in other traditional neural networks. Hence, instead of having each neuron receive connections from all neurons in the previous layer, CNNs use a receptive field-like layout in which each neuron receives connections only from a subset of neurons in the previous (lower) layer. The receptive field of a neuron in one of the lower layers encompasses only a small area of the image, while the receptive field of a neuron in subsequent (higher) layers involves a combination of receptive fields from several (but not all) neurons in the layer before (i. e. a neuron in a higher layer "looks" at a larger portion of the image than does a neuron in a lower layer). In this way, each successive layer is capable of learning increasingly abstract features of the original image. The use of receptive fields in this fashion is thought to give CNNs an advantage in recognizing visual patterns when compared to other types of neural networks.

== See also ==
- Visual system
- Reflexogenic zone
- Spatiotemporal receptive field
- Spectro-temporal receptive field
- Computer vision
- Edge detection
- Convolutional neural network
