= Reflexogenous zone =

Area of the body which shows an unconditioned reflex

Reflexogenous (reflexogenic) zone (or the receptive field of a reflex) is the area of the body stimulation of which causes a definite unconditioned reflex. For example, stimulation of the mucosa of the nasopharynx elicits a sneezing reflex, and stimulation of the tracheae and bronchi elicits a coughing reflex. The receptive fields of various reflexes may overlap, and in consequence a stimulus applied to a certain part of the skin can elicit one reflex or another depending on its strength and the state of the central nervous system.
