= Population vector =

In neuroscience, a population vector is the sum of the preferred directions of a population of neurons, weighted by the respective spike counts.

The formula for computing the (normalized) population vector, $F$, takes the following form:

$F = \frac{\sum_j m_j F_j}{\sum_j m_j}$

Where $m_j$ is the activity of cell $j$, and $F_j$ is the preferred input for cell $j$.

Note that the vector $F$ encodes the input direction, $F_j$, in terms of the activation of a population of neurons.
