= Hypercomplex cell =

Neuron in the cerebral cortex used for visual processing

A hypercomplex cell (currently called an end-stopped cell) is a type of visual processing neuron in the mammalian cerebral cortex. Initially discovered by David Hubel and Torsten Wiesel in 1965, hypercomplex cells are defined by the property of end-stopping, which is a decrease in firing strength with increasingly larger stimuli. The sensitivity to stimulus length is accompanied by selectivity for the specific orientation, motion, and direction of stimuli. For example, a hypercomplex cell may only respond to a line at 45˚ that travels upward. Elongating the line would result in a proportionately weaker response. Ultimately, hypercomplex cells can provide a means for the brain to visually perceive corners and curves in the environment by identifying the ends of a given stimulus .

Hypercomplex cells were originally characterized as the superordinate class of visual processing cells above complex and simple cells. Whereas complex cells were sensitive to moving stimuli of specific orientations that travel in a specific direction, simple cells only responded to properly oriented linear stimuli. Neither simple nor complex cells were believed to display end-stopping. Likewise, end-stopping was believed to be restricted to higher order visual areas (Brodmann area 18 and Brodmann area 19), but was later discovered to also exist in the primary visual cortex (Brodmann area 17). By 1968, Geoffrey Henry and Bogdan Dreher discovered simple and complex cells with end-stopping properties. Subsequently, hypercomplex cells were no longer recognized as a distinct class but rather a subtype of simple and complex cells. Currently, simple end-stopped and complex end-stopped cells are the terms of choice to describe neurons with end-stopping properties.

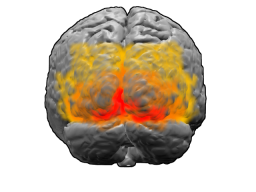
Brodmann area 17 (red) and higher order visual areas, Brodmann area 18 (orange) and Brodmann area 19 (yellow), are part of the visual cortex.

== Background ==
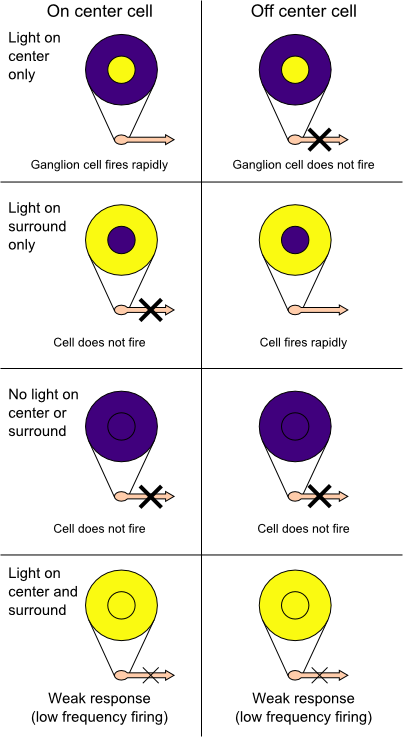
Cells with on-centre receptive fields fire when the excitatory centre is illuminated and are inhibited when the surround is illuminated. Off-centre cells respond to the opposite pattern of light.

Knowledge of cortical function was relatively limited by the 1950s. However, towards the end of the decade, the platform for understanding the cortex was being laid out. Investigations into the localization of function as well as the advent of single-cell recordings of neurons fostered greater insights into the processing of information from sensation to perception. With reference to vision, Stephen Kuffler discovered areas of the retina, termed receptive fields, that upon stimulation, would influence the firing of ganglion cells. These fields comprised two concentric layers, one excitatory and the other inhibitory. One type of receptive field was described as on-centre, containing an excitatory centre and an inhibitory surround, while the other type was termed off-centre, containing an inhibitory centre and an excitatory surround. Similar receptive fields were discovered in the lateral geniculate nucleus (LGN).

Two doctoral students in Kuffler’s lab at Johns Hopkins University, David Hubel and Torsten Wiesel, were tasked with extending his work from retinal ganglion cells to the visual cortex. Hubel and Wiesel began recording cells in the cortex while presenting spots of light as stimuli. To start, the two had failed to produce any promising recordings, as the cells would not respond to the given stimuli. However, while inserting the glass slide into the projector, a strong signal was immediately elicited. Serendipitously, Hubel and Wiesel had discovered that the cell was not responding to spots but to edges, namely the slide’s shadow as it was placed into the projector.

Hubel and Wiesel would later call this cell a complex cell, incorporating it into a hierarchy of subsequently discovered visual processing cells, which included the centre-surround, simple, complex, and hypercomplex cells (distinguishable by receptive fields)

Original Organization of Visual Processing Cells by Hubel and Wiesel
Cell Type	Selectivity	Location
Simple	orientation, position	Brodmann area 17
Complex	orientation, motion, direction	Brodmann area 17 and 18
Hypercomplex	orientation, motion, direction, length	Brodmann areas 18 and 19

=== Simple cells ===
Following their initial finding, Hubel and Wiesel discovered the presence of a variety of visual processing cells, each with unique receptive field properties. At the lowest and simplest level of the hierarchy are the aforementioned centre-surround cells of the retinal ganglion and LGN. Next, within the visual cortex, are simple cells. Simple cells exist within the primary visual cortex (Brodmann Area 17). These cells are found specifically in layer IV, at which most outgoing projections from the LGN terminate. The receptive fields of simple cells are non-concentric and linear, in which excitatory and inhibitory regions exist adjacent to one another. Thus, a response is elicited by stationary linear stimuli. Furthermore, the regions exhibit mutual cancellation (antagonism) and produce stronger responses as the stimuli fill more space (spatial summation). A discerning feature of simple cells is that their responses display orientation and positional selectivity. This means that a simple cell fires at an optimal orientation. Elicited responses get progressively weaker as a stimulus's orientation shifts sub-optimally and ceases to fire when at 90˚ from the optimal orientation. Positional selectivity simply refers to the cell's receptiveness to the position of the stimulus within part or all of the excitatory/inhibitory regions. Accordingly, simple cell receptive fields exist in a variety of different geometries and sizes for all possible orientation and positions in the visual field. It is presumed that multiple concentric LGN receptive fields converge in a line to develop a single simple receptive field.

Simple cells are sensitive to the orientation of a visual stimulus. A simple cell will fire weakly or not at all if both excitatory and inhibitory regions are activated (a), but will fire optimally if the stimulus is oriented within the excitatory region only (b). Orientation selectivity is produced by multiple centre-surround receptive fields aligned at a certain angle (c). A complex cell responds to moving stimuli and is sensitive to direction as well as orientation (d).

=== Complex cells ===
Beyond simple cells are complex cells, which are the most common type in the primary visual cortex (but are also found in Brodmann area 18). Akin to simple cells, complex cell receptive fields are orientation selective. However, unlike simple cells, complex cells do not respond to stationary stimuli. To produce a sustained response, the stimulus must be moving across the receptive field. The motion selectivity of complex cells means that a response is elicited over a vast range of stimulus positions. A substantial number of complex cells also display directional selectivity, such that movement in only one direction produces an optimal response. The cortical architecture of complex cells consists of converging adjacent simple cells with receptive fields that display the same orientation selectivity. To account for the motion selectivity of complex cells, Hubel and Wiesel postulated that the system of simple cells only elicits a brief response to stationary stimuli (i.e. the response adapts). Accordingly, successive stimulations that proceed across the complex receptive field are required to elicit a sustained response; thereby, producing motion selectivity.

Although the above definitions, established by Hubel and Wiesel, are the most widely accepted, some of their contemporaries had initially distinguished the classes along different criteria. In sum, Hubel and Wiesel identified simple cells by discernibly separate excitatory and inhibitory regions that responded to stationary stimuli. Contrastingly, Peter Bishop used other criteria and included moving stimuli within the definition of simple cells.

In addition to Hubel and Wiesel's wiring schemes, multiple alternative and complementary architectures have been put forth to explain the receptive fields of simple and complex cells:

- Otto Creutzfeldt amended the circuitry architecture by noting that synaptic excitation may be required to overcome a direct inhibitory input by adjacent neurons.
- Colin Blakemore based his explanation on visual tilt effects. He postulated that a neuron's orientation selectivity should be sharpened when receiving inhibitory input from cell's whose optimal orientation is different.

=== Hypercomplex cells ===
By 1965, the next cell type in Hubel and Wiesel’s hierarchy of visual processing, the hypercomplex cell, was found within Brodmann areas 18 and 19. Upon discovery, hypercomplex cells were defined as, “all cells that exceed complex cells in intricacy of behavior.” Hypercomplex cells displayed selectivity akin to complex cells, responding to moving a stimulus of a specific orientation in a specific direction.

The hypercomplex cell above is stopped at one end (i.e. the right). As the length of the stimulus increases, it enters the antagonistic region, and causes a decrease in response (depicted as single-cell recording signals on the right). Note this cell is also sensitive to orientation, motion, and direction.

Furthermore, much like the subordinate processing cells, increasing illumination in a particular region elicited stronger responses (i.e. spatial summation). However, this summation was confined to stimuli of a limited size. Extending beyond a specific length, the response would become progressively weaker. This phenomenon is termed end-stopping, and it is the defining property of hypercomplex cells. Hubel and Wiesel characterize these receptive fields as containing activating and antagonistic regions (similar to excitatory/inhibitory regions). For example, the left half of a receptive field can be the activating region, while the antagonistic region lies on the right. Accordingly, the hypercomplex cell will respond, with spatial summation, to stimuli on the left side (within the activating region) insofar as it does not extend further into the right side (antagonistic region). This receptive field would be described as stopped at one end (i.e. the right). Similarly, hypercomplex receptive fields can be stopped at both ends. In this case, a stimulus that extends too far in either direction (e.g. too far left or too far right) will begin to stimulate the antagonistic region and reduce the strength of the cell’s signal. Note that hypercomplex cells are also selective to orientation, motion, and direction. In fact, the activating region will have the same orientation selectivity as the antagonistic region. Thus, only a line that extends into the antagonistic region will decrease response strength, rather than another differently oriented line. One possible scheme for the wiring of hypercomplex cells could comprise excitatory input from a complex cell within the activating region and inhibitory input by complex cells in the outlying antagonistic regions.

== End-stopped cells ==
Shortly after Hubel and Wiesel included hypercomplexity into their version of the visual processing hierarchy, the notion of a class of hypercomplex cells was contended. In 1968, Geoffrey Henry and Bogdan Dreher discovered simple and complex cells in Brodmann area 17 that exhibited end-stopping properties. Rather than characterizing end-stopping as exclusive to a superordinate class of neurons, it was more appropriate to ascribe it as a property of simple and complex cells. Only a few years later, Charles Gilbert, a graduate student of Hubel and Wiesel, had confirmed end-stopping in the primary visual cortex. Accordingly, the terms simple end-stopped and complex end-stopped were introduced in lieu of the hypercomplex cell. The hypercomplex cells described by Hubel and Wiesel earlier were likely a set of end-stopped complex cells. In his Nobel Prize lecture, Hubel explained that the hierarchy of visual processing cells proved to be more complicated and amorphous than initially believed, noting that the topic began to resemble a “jungle”.

Top: End-stopped cells can detect curves. Note the properly oriented curve lies within the activating region but recedes and rotates before it enters the antagonistic regions. This cell is stopped at both ends and will not respond to lines that are not oriented 180˚. Bottom: End-stopped cells, like those that are stopped at one end, can also detect corners. The response of the cell will be stronger when the corner is only in the activating region (left image) and weaker when the corner enters the antagonistic region (right image).

=== Visual perception ===
Ultimately, these cells contribute to mechanisms underlying visual perception. A simple end-stopped cell will display length selectivity as well as orientation selectivity. In terms of cortical architecture, it may receive input from ordinary simple cells of identical orientation. For example, the activating region could consist of a simple cell that sends excitatory input, while the antagonistic region could consist of simple cells that provide inhibitory input. A complex end-stopped cell would select for orientation, motion, and direction, but also for length. It could receive input from a set of complex cells, in a similar fashion to the scheme previously mentioned. The activating region could consist of a complex cell that sends excitatory input and the antagonistic region could consist of complex cells that send inhibitory input.

The optimal stimulus for any end-stopped cell is one of a limited length. This translates into a capacity to identify corners (for cells stopped at one end) and curves (for cells stopped at both ends). Likewise, the cortex perceives visual scenes with an emphasis on the edges and borders of objects. The visual processing cells in the cortex respond very poorly to diffuse light but optimally to lines. For instance, a simple cell will only weakly fire if it is entirely illuminated because both the excitatory and inhibitory regions will be stimulated.

If the object were a square, for example, then simple cells with receptive fields that corresponded to the inside of the square would not be stimulated. However, a simple cell with a receptive field that corresponded to the edge of the square would be stimulated as long as the edge lays within its excitatory region. Following suit, complex cells would respond weakly to the interior but strongly to an appropriate edge. Lastly, end-stopped cells would also be stimulated by the corners of the square. An end-stopped cell would not respond to an edge on the side of the square because the line would stimulate both the activating and antagonistic regions simultaneously. For instance, a cell stopped at the right end (i.e. antagonistic region on the right) would be stimulated by the right corner. Although perceiving a square involves much more than the contributions of simple and complex cells, this example illustrates that the edges and borders of a stimulus (without input from the interior) are sufficient to interpret its form. Thus, the mechanism of focusing on edges to translate activation into perception is an efficient use of neural resources.

== Other research areas ==
Although end-stopped cells are a phenomenon of the mammalian visual cortex, there have been discoveries of cells exhibiting end-stopping properties within a variety of other species. For example, the small-target motion detectors (STMDs) of many insects select for small moving targets but are inhibited or unresponsive to larger stimuli. STMDs are used to discern moving insects from surrounding clutter, and are thus vital for pursuit behaviours.

Beyond investigating the integrative effects of end-stopping in visual perception, researchers are incorporating end-stopped cells (and other visual processing cells) into computational models that simulate the hierarchical representation of shape in the brain.
