= Spectro-temporal receptive field =

Characteristic of neurons

The spectro-temporal receptive field or spatio-temporal receptive field (STRF) of a neuron represents which types of stimuli excite or inhibit that neuron. "Spectro-temporal" refers most commonly to audition, where the neuron's response depends on frequency versus time, while "spatio-temporal" refers to vision, where the neuron's response depends on spatial location versus time. Thus they are not exactly the same concept, but both are referred to as STRF and serve a similar role in the analysis of neural responses.

If linearity is assumed, the neuron can be modeled as having a time-varying firing rate equal to the convolution of the stimulus with the STRF.

== Auditory STRFs ==
The example STRF here is for an auditory neuron from the area CM (caudal medial) of a male zebra finch, when played conspecific birdsong. The colour of this plot shows the effect of sound on this neuron: this neuron tends to be excited by sound from about 2.5 kHz to 7 kHz heard by the animal 12 ms ago, but it is inhibited by sound in the same frequency range from about 18 ms ago.

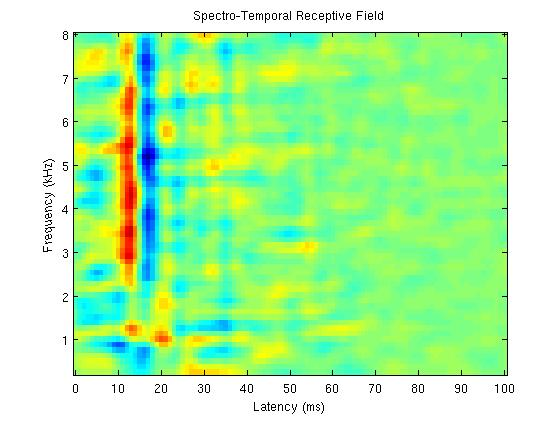
STRF generated with STRFPAK.

== Visual STRFs ==
See

- Dario L. Ringach Receptive Fields in Macaque Primary Visual Cortex Spatial Structure and Symmetry of Simple-Cell (2002)
- J. H. van Hateren and D. L. Ruderman Independent component analysis of natural image sequences yields spatio-temporal filters similar to simple cells in primary visual cortex (2002)

== Idealized computational models for auditory receptive fields ==
A computational theory for early auditory receptive fields can be expressed from normative physical, mathematical and perceptual arguments, permitting axiomatic derivation of auditory receptive fields in two stages:

- a first stage of temporal receptive fields corresponding to an idealized cochlea model modeled as window Fourier transform with either Gabor functions in the case of non-causal time or Gammatone functions alternatively generalized Gammatone functions for a truly time-causal model in which the future cannot be accessed,
- a second layer of spectra-temporal receptive fields modeled as Gaussian functions over the log-spectral domain and either Gaussian kernels over time in the case of non-causal time or first-order integrators (truncated exponential kernels) coupled in cascade in the case of truly time-causal operations.

These shapes of the receptive field functions in these models can be determined by necessity from structural properties of the environment combined with requirements about the internal structure of the auditory system to enable theoretically well-founded processing of sound signals at different temporal and log-spectral scales.
