= Active perception =

Actions to enhance ability to understand

Active perception is the selecting of behaviors to increase information from the flow of data those behaviors produce in a particular environment. In other words, to understand the world, we move around and explore it—sampling the world through our senses to construct an understanding (perception) of the environment on the basis of that behavior (action). Within the construct of active perception, interpretation of sensory data is inherently inseparable from the behaviors required to capture that data. Action and perception are tightly coupled. This has been developed most comprehensively with respect to vision (active vision) where an agent (animal, robot, human, camera mount) changes position to improve the view of a specific object, or where an agent uses movement to perceive the environment (e.g., a robot avoiding obstacles).

By a more formal definition, active perception is:

"...a study of Modeling and Control strategies for perception. By modeling we mean models of sensors, processing modules and their interaction. We distinguish local models from global models by their extent of application in space and time. The local models represent procedures and parameters such as optical distortions of the lens, focal lens, spatial resolution, band-pass filter, etc. The global models on the other hand characterize the overall performance and make predictions on how the individual modules interact. The control strategies are formulated as a search of such sequence of steps that would minimize a loss function while one is seeking the most information. Examples are shown as the existence proof of the proposed theory on obtaining range from focus and sterolvergence on 2-0 segmentation of an image and 3-0 shape parametrization".

The theory of optical flow derives from concepts of active perception, and while optical flow is now typically considered a vector representation of motion captured by a vision sensor (camera), it was originally described in terms of active perception. The behavior of the agent (animal, robot, human) in the world generates a flow of data over the visual sensor (camera, eye), which is sampled by the sensor and interpreted into a percept of the environment by the agent, through some computation. On the basis of this percept the agent selects another behavior that generates more data flow. Thus optical flow is the data flow carried by light from the environment to the vision sensor as a result of movement in the environment.

A related but narrower definition of active perception represents perception and action within the brain as the same thing. It states that when a person sees an action, it internally translates into, and is understood within the context of, a possible action. This supports the capability in people and animals of learning what to do based on what they see others doing.

== Ecological Psychology ==
Active perception is part of the broader field of ecological psychology. Ecological psychology (and theories of ecological perception) was formulated by gestalt psychologists in the 1930s, and refined by Gibson through the 1950s to 1970s. The theory has held strong, although for the approximately 80 years that it has been around, it has always been considered a niche area of psychology.

== Applications of active perception ==
There is a wide range of work on the application of active perception to robotics, including ground vehicles, underwater vehicles, and air vehicles. As one would expect, when optical flow is included in the definition of active perception then the volume of related work significantly increases.

== See also ==
- Active inference
