= List of SUNY Downstate Health Sciences University people =

The State University of New York Downstate Health Science University or SUNY Downstate Health Sciences University, is a public medical school and academic medical center in Brooklyn, New York. Historically, it was known as Long Island College of Medicine (1860–1950), State University Medical Center at New York City (1950–1960), Downstate Medical Center (1960–1986), and State University of New York Health Science Center at Brooklyn (1986–2019). Following are some of the notable alumni and faculty of the university.

== Alumni ==
=== Academia ===
- Herbert L. Abrams (1946) – radiologist at Harvard Medical School and the Stanford University School of Medicine; founding vice president of International Physicians for the Prevention of Nuclear War
- Bernard Challenor – professor and acting dean at Columbia University Mailman School of Public Health
- Duncan W. Clark (1936) – dean of the Long Island College of Medicine and chairman of the department of environmental medicine and community health at SUNY Downstate
- Allen Frances (1967) – professor and chairman emeritus of the Department of Psychiatry and Behavioral Sciences at Duke University School of Medicine
- Leon Gordis (1958) – public health officer, professor, and researcher in pediatrics at Johns Hopkins School of Medicine and Sinai Hospital
- Gerald Imber (1996) – plastic surgeon, assistant clinical professor of surgery at the New York Hospital-Cornell Medical Center
- Dara Kass (2003) – associate professor of emergency medicine at Columbia University Irving Medical Center
- Susan Love (1974) – prominent advocate of preventive breast cancer research; professor of surgery at David Geffen School of Medicine at UCLA
- James Mahoney (1986) – head of the intensive care unit and a clinical assistant professor of medicine at the SUNY Downstate Medical Center
- Thomas G. McGinn (1989) – professor at Baylor College of Medicine and chief of the Division of General Internal Medicine at Mount Sinai Medical Center
- Frank Moya – chair of the Department of Anestesiology at the University of Miami School of Medicine
- Ralph Snyderman (1965) – chancellor emeritus and dean of the Duke University School of Medicine
- Richard Allen Williams (1962) – clinical professor of medicine at the UCLA School of Medicine and founder of the Association of Black Cardiologists

=== Chemistry ===
- Harry Wiener (1949) – chemist at Pfizer

=== Entertainment ===
- Tony Marvin (non-graduate) – radio and television announcer
- Calvin Sun (2014) – physician, filmmaker, and blogger known for The Monsoon Diaries

=== Literature and journalism ===
- Andrew G. Bostom (1990) – nonfiction writer and former associate professor of medicine and researcher at Brown University Medical School
- Howard Choi (1997) – principal editor of the PM&R Handbook and assistant professor of rehabilitation medicine at Mount Sinai School of Medicine
- Nadia Hashimi – novelist, pediatrician, and a former candidate for the U.S. House of Representatives
- Marc Straus (1968) – oncologist, poet, and writer

=== Medicine ===
- Daniel L. Aaron (2005) - chief of Shoulder and Elbow Division of the University of Massachusetts Department of Orthopedics and Physical Rehabilitation
- Joseph R. Bertino (1954) – chief scientific officer a at Rutgers Cancer Institute of New Jersey
- Eli Friedman (1957) – chief of the Division of Nephrology 1963–2009; inventor of the portable hemodialysis machine
- Nieca Goldberg (1984) – medical director at the Joan H. Tisch Center for Women's Health at the NYU Langone Medical Center
- Adrian Kantrowitz (1943) – inventor of the intra-aortic balloon pump and left ventricular assist device
- Donald F. Klein (1952) – medical director of the New York State Psychiatric Institute and professor of psychiatry at Columbia University
- Arthur Krigsman (1989) – pediatrician and gastroenterologist
- A. L. Mestel (1952) – pioneer in the field of pediatric surgery, known for the first successful separation of Ischiopagus Tripus conjoined twins
- James A. Nicholas (1945) – physician for the New York Jets, the New York Knicks, and the New York Rangers
- William E. Paul (1960) – immunologist and director of the Office of AIDS Research
- Alan S. Rabson – pathologist and cancer researcher, deputy director of the National Cancer Institute 1995–2015
- Arthur Schatzkin (1976) – nutritional epidemiologist at the National Cancer Institute
- Leonard Shengold (1951) – psychiatrist known for studies on child abuse and popularizing the term "soul murder"
- Louis Wender (1913) – chief of psychiatry at Beth Israel Hospital
- Alexander S. Wiener (1930) – biologist and physician specializing in forensic medicine, serology, and immunogenetics
- Abraham Wikler (1935) – psychiatrist and neurologist who specialized in drug addiction

=== Politics ===
- José N. Gándara (1933) – heart specialist and chairman of the Puerto Rico Housing Authority
- Walter Lear (1946) – physician and activist for healthcare reform and LGBT rights
- Howard Levy (1961) – United States Army doctor who became a resister to the Vietnam War
- Joseph L. Pfeifer (1914) – member of United States House of Representatives

=== Sports ===
- Robert Contiguglia (1967) – president of the United States Soccer Federation
- Dorothy Locke – fencer who competed in the 1932 Summer Olympics and 1936 Summer Olympics
- George A. Sheehan – 1972 Summer Olympics gold medalist in the marathon; non-fiction author

== Faculty ==
- Alfred Adler – psychotherapist; associate of Sigmund Freud; visiting professor of medical psychiatry at the Long Island College of Medicine
- Henri Begleiter – former distinguished professor of psychiatry and neuroscience at SUNY Downstate Medical Center
- Chandler McCuskey Brooks – chairman of the physiology and pharmacology departments at Long Island College of Medicine
- F. Charles Brunicardi – dean of the College of Medicine at SUNY Downstate Health Sciences University
- Giulio Cantoni – assistant professor of pharmacology at Long Island College of Medicine 1945–1948; director of the United States' National Institutes of Health's biochemistry laboratory
- Duncan W. Clark – dean of the Long Island College of Medicine and chairman of the department of environmental medicine and community health at SUNY Downstate
- Raymond Damadian – former professor and inventor of the MR Scanning Machine; first person to perform a full-body MR scan on a human
- Clarence Dennis – chair of the Department of Surgery (1951), inventor of one of the first cardiopulmonary bypass machines
- Robert Latou Dickinson – professor of obstetrics and gynecology at the Long Island College of Medicine
- Richard D. Feinman – professor of cell biology
- Eli Friedman – chief of the Division of Nephrology 1963–2009; inventor of the portable hemodialysis machine
- Robert F. Furchgott – professor of pharmacology 1956–1989; recipient of the 1998 Nobel Prize in Physiology or Medicine
- Phillips Foster Greene – clinical professor of surgery and associate dean at Long Island College of Medicine 1944–1951
- Frank Hastings Hamilton – chair of military medicine during the Civil War
- Pascal James Imperato – founding dean of the School of Public Health
- Samuel L. Kountz – chairman of the Department of surgery at Downstate Medical Center; performed the first successful kidney transplant between non-identical humans
- Stephen Macknik – professor of ophthalmology, neurology, physiology, and pharmacology; co-author of Sleights of Mind
- James Mahoney – head of the intensive care unit and a clinical assistant professor of medicine at the SUNY Downstate Medical Center
- Susana Martinez-Conde – professor of ophthalmology, neurology, physiology, and pharmacology; co-author of Sleights of Mind
- William Montagna – assistant professor at the Long Island College of Medicine 1945–1948; later head of experimental biology at Oregon Health & Science University and director of the Oregon National Primate Research Center
- James B. Ranck Jr. – professor emeritus of physiology; discoverer of head direction cells
- T. K. Sreepada Rao – former professor of medicine and associate director of renal diseases
- Alexander Skene – president of the college 1893–1899, dean of the faculty 1886–1892, professor of diseases of women and clinical obstetrics
- Evelyn M. Witkin – bacterial geneticist at SUNY Downstate Medical Center 1955–1971; recipient of the National Medal of Science
