= Alain Nu =

American mentalist and personality

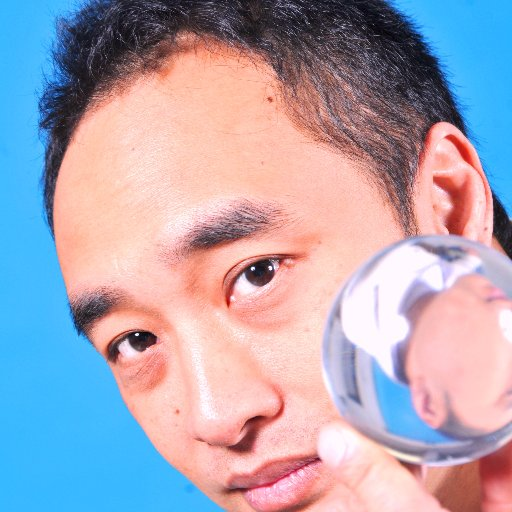
- Headshot of Alain Nu
- Born: San Francisco, California
- Occupations: Mentalist; illusionist; magician; author
- Website: www.themanwhoknows.tv

Alain Nu is an American mentalist, illusionist, television personality, author, and speaker. He is known for stage tricks which appear to be demonstrations of ESP, mind reading, telekinesis, metal bending, and illusions. Nu's career as an entertainer has spanned more than three decades, with performances and appearances in many countries. Nu's trademarked brand is "The Man Who Knows."

== Early life ==
Nu was born in San Francisco, California. His mother and father were from China and Vietnam respectively. Nu is the son of Hoa Nguyen, a retired librarian of the Library of Congress, and Janet C. Nguyen (née Yeh), a retired librarian of the National Library of Medicine.

At the age of 5, Nu's family moved to Ithaca, New York, and at the age of 8, Nu's family moved to Bethesda, Maryland, a suburb of Washington, DC. Nu set out to be a great magician at a very young age. It is stated in the book State of Mind, "As a youth, his interest in the unknown manifested in anything he could research and/or get away with -- basement seances, UFO clubs, and playfully testing he and his friends' psychic ability with playing cards. He asked his father, who worked at the Library of Congress, to bring home hard-to-find books on magic, strange phenomena, and parapsychology, so he could learn as much as possible about these topics."

At the age of 13, Nu became a member of DeMolay International, a fraternal organization (associated with Freemasonry) for young men, later achieving the elected position of master councilor (highest-ranking member) of the Samuel Gompers and Potomac Chevy Chase DeMolay chapters.

== Performing career ==
At the age of 19, Nu was hired as the stage/road manager for a theatrical illusion show entitled the Denny & Lee show, which performed at clubs, resorts, corporate events, and universities across the U.S. Nu set up the equipment and ran the sound and lights for the show. From 2000 to 2004, Nu performed annually in a show titled The Mysterious World of Alain Nu at Caesars Palace in Las Vegas, Nevada. In 2005, Nu was the subject of a series of four television specials on TLC entitled The Mysterious World of Alain Nu.

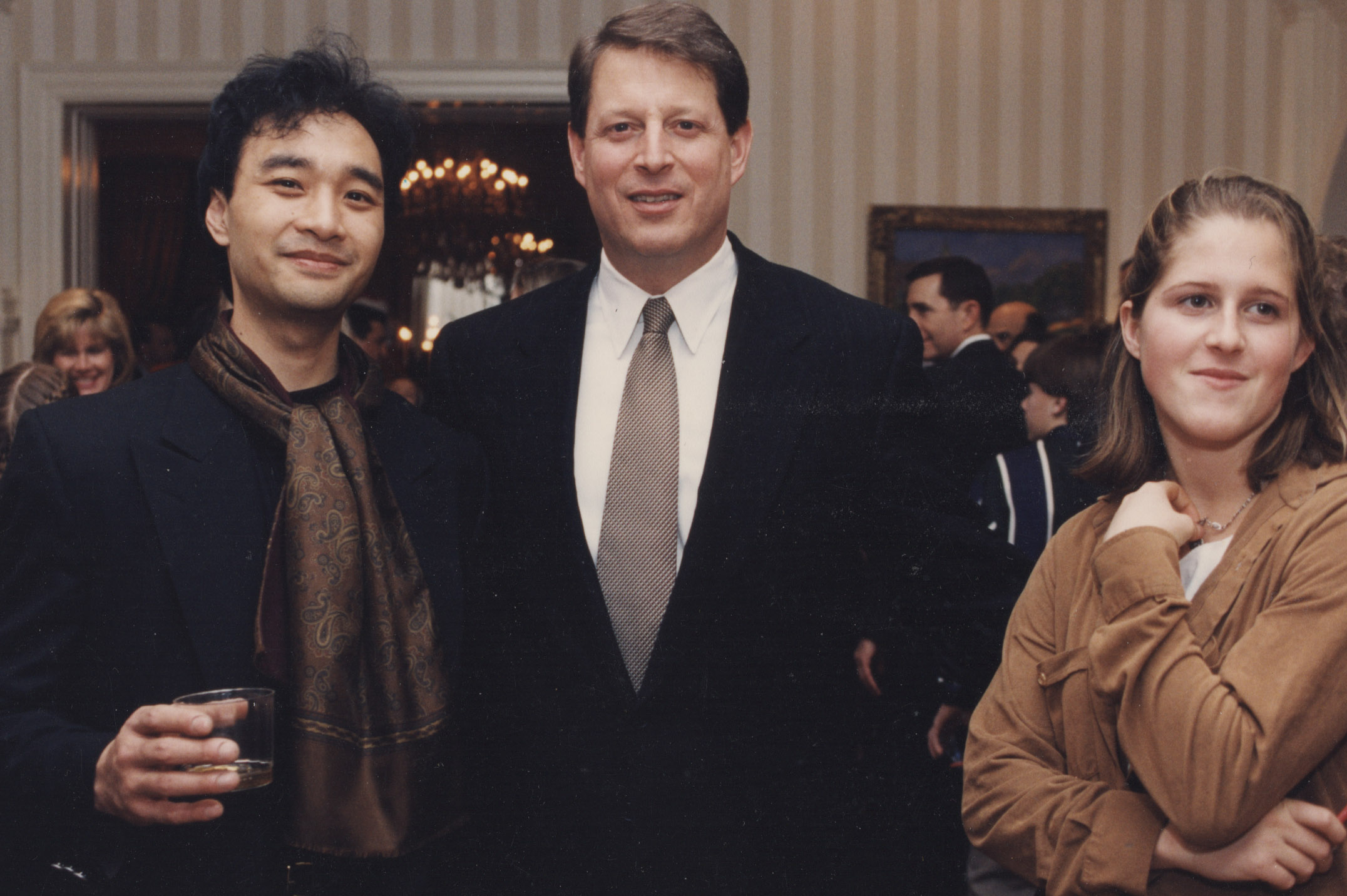

Nu helped organize entertainment for the friends and families of the many surviving Medal of Honor recipients for The American Legion's Presidential Inaugural Ball. He also performed at the second of George W. Bush's inaugural events. Nu also performed three times at the vice president's residence during Al Gore's tenure.

In 2006, Nu performed a show called Circus of the Mind at the National Theatre in Washington, DC. From 2008 to 2012, Nu toured with a one-man show entitled Invisible Connections. In 2010, Nu performed the show for six weeks in Las Vegas. He also performed the show at universities and colleges, high school "Project Graduation" events, corporate and private events, and organizations' fundraisers.

From 2011 to 2016, Nu performed an annual show entitled The ESP in Espionage at the International Spy Museum in Washington, DC. The show was inspired by the Stargate Project, the trickery of spies, and other top secret projects. From January to May 2014, Nu was a headliner performing as the premier mind-reader at the "Illusionarium" aboard Norwegian Cruise Line's Norwegian Getaway. The "Illusionarium" is an entertainment venue devoted to magic and illusion performances.

From 2016 to 2020, Nu was a producer and performer for "Hocus Joke Us," a comedy open mic and magic show held on Monday nights at Madam's Organ Blues Bar in the Adams Morgan neighborhood of Washington, DC. In 2000, Eric Brace of The Washington Post called Nu, "a magician of the highest order".

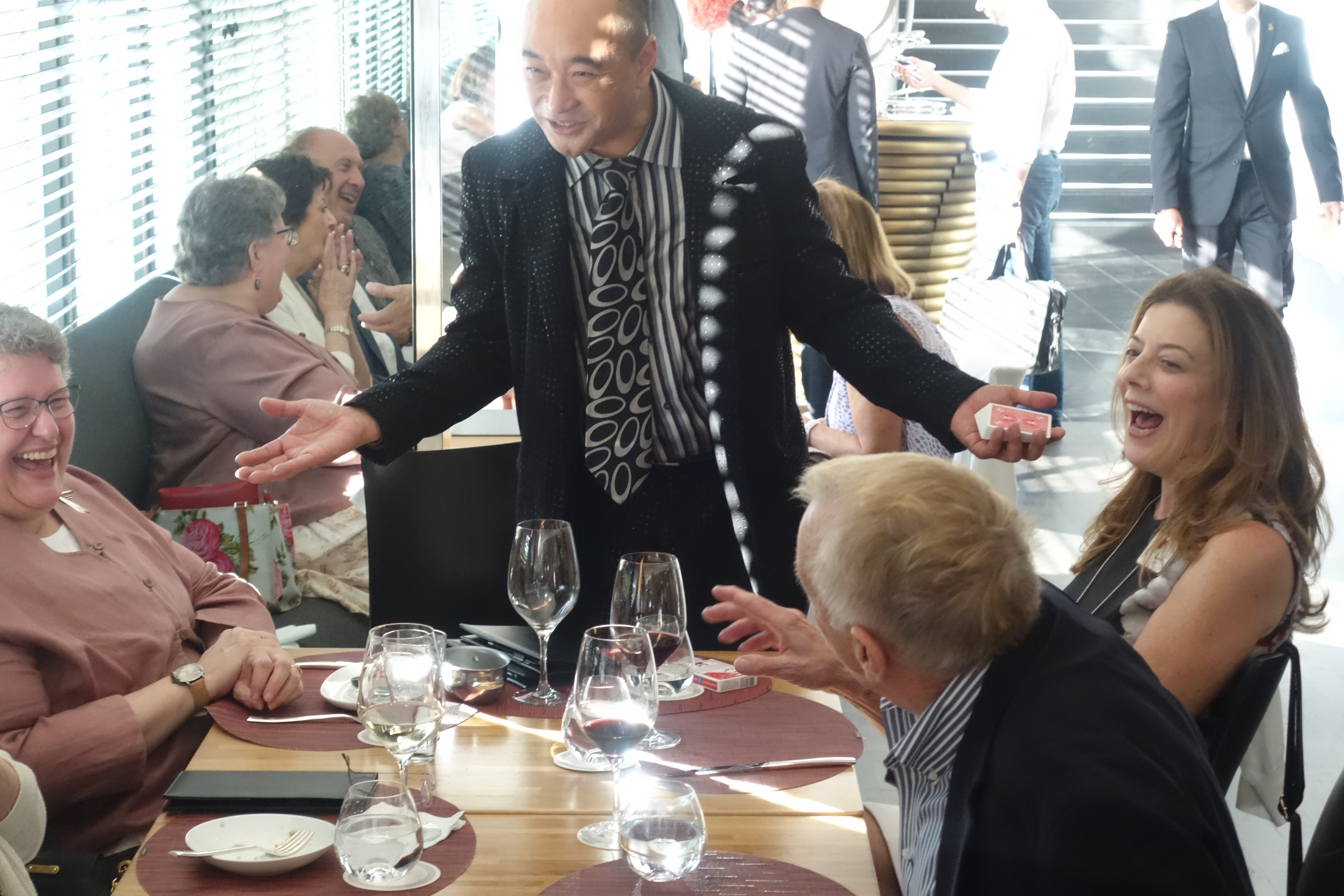

In 2017, Nu became The Watergate Hotel's "Resident Man of Mystery," performing at the rooftop restaurant In February 2018, Nu was featured in a video on The Washington Post's website, in which he bent a spoon and performed effects. The video accompanied a feature article on Nu for The Washington Post Magazine's "Just Asking" column.

Nu performed a show at the Theatre of Dreams in Castle Rock, Colorado, on May 4, 2018. Nu performed for the District of Columbia Mayor's Office Asian American and Pacific Islander Heritage Month Celebration on May 7, 2018, at the Lincoln Theatre in Washington, DC. In October 2018, Nu began weekly appearances at The Lexington Hotel NYC in New York City. On Oct. 31, 2018, Nu was one of several magicians gathered at Harry Houdini's first home in New York City to perform during a séance held annually on the anniversary of Houdini's death, later doing a special Halloween performance at The Lexington Hotel.

Nu was the opening act for Poe's Magic Theatre at the Lord Baltimore Hotel in Baltimore on June 1, 2019. "Alain Nu amazed with phenomenal psychic predictions, impossible metal bending and even something a little bizarre with the works of Edgar Allan Poe," stated Vince Wilson, founder of the theatre. In August 2019, Nu was one of the performers at the 82nd annual Abbott's Get Together, a magic convention, in Colon, Michigan.

In January 2020, Nu began a residency, performing as "The Man Who Knows," in Las Vegas at OYO Hotel & Casino. Nu's Las Vegas residency was cut short in mid-March 2020 by the COVID-19 pandemic.

During the pandemic, Nu developed virtual shows and began performing them over Zoom and other similar platforms. In April 2020, Nu was a special guest, along with Jason Mraz, Maria Canals-Barrera, Landau Eugene Murphy Jr., and others, for a fundraiser by Inclusion Matters called "Global Day of Play" to raise money for inclusive playgrounds for children of all abilities worldwide. Nu's virtual show was the grand opening performance for The Forum Virtual Theatre on Aug. 14, 2020, and he performed the show for five consecutive Friday nights. Nu's article, "5 Ways to Produce a Winning Zoom Show," was published in the October 2020 issue of "Vanish" magazine.

In November 2020, Nu was the first mentalist to reopen as a headliner in Las Vegas, at Alexis Park Resort, since the pandemic began, as part of Las Vegas' soft reopening of socially-distanced live shows. Nu was a guest on "The Authenticity Show" and "MindDog TV" in March 2021. In April 2021, Nu's Las Vegas show was number three in KTNV Channel 13's list of "13 Things To Do This Week In Las Vegas." In May 2021, Nu was noted to be the only Asian American headliner performing in Las Vegas thus far into 2021.

In July 2021, Nu attempted to bend more than 100 spoons at a telekinetic spoon bending live event in Las Vegas. At the event, a total of 102 bent spoons were counted by the judge, Anthony Curtis (writer) from the "Las Vegas Advisor." In January 2022, Nu was the defendant in an episode of Judge Jerry, a reality TV court show with Jerry Springer as the presiding judge. Nu was sued by Las Vegas magician Murray Sawchuck.

Nu appeared on the VICE TV series "The VICE Guide to Vegas" in July 2022. In the episode, Nu assists TV host Taji Ameen with a blind date consisting of a picnic on a Nevada hiking trail. VICE's video description states, "To cover all bases, Taji calls in mind reader Alain Nu who observes the date from nearby and provides Taji with supernatural insight on what his date is thinking."

Nu was recognized by Tripadvisor as a "2022 Travelers' Choice" award winner for his international touring stage show. Tripadvisor's Travelers' Choice award goes to the top 10 percent of attractions worldwide that received outstanding reviews on the platform over the previous 12 months.

Nu began a residency in Downtown Las Vegas at the Notoriety Theater inside Neonopolis in January 2023.

Nu was featured on the "Talk About Las Vegas with Ira" podcast in January 2023.

== Television ==
Year	Title	Role	Notes
2005	The Mysterious World of Alain Nu	Himself	Limited series on TLC
2012	98 Rock TV - Baltimore	Himself	Appears with TV hosts Justin Schlegel and Pele Lovell
2015	WTOP News	Himself	Spoon-bending mentalist Alain Nu shows off his talents
2018	Voice of America Mandarin Service	Himself	For daily TV news program "Eye on America"
2021	Fox 5 Las Vegas	Himself	News segment
2022	Judge Jerry	Himself	Court show segment
2022	The VICE Guide to Vegas	Himself	Appears with TV host Taji Ameen
2023	News 3 Las Vegas	Himself	Morning news segment

== Lecture circuit ==
In 2014, Nu was a presenter, along with Stephen Macknik, Susana Martinez-Conde and Richard Restak, for an event in Washington, DC, entitled "Now You See it, Now You Don't. Is Anything Really as it Seems? The Science of Illusion." The event was part of the "Neuroscience and Society" series, a partnership between the Dana Foundation and the American Association for the Advancement of Science. In 2015, Nu was a panelist, along with Marc Sebrechts and Richard Restak, for an event in Washington, DC, entitled "Raising Ghosts: A paranormal discussion and demonstration," hosted by the Molotov Theatre Group. Nu has lectured for John Petersen's The Arlington Institute Transition Talks series in Berkeley Springs, West Virginia. Nu was also interviewed on camera by John Petersen as part of The Arlington Institute's video series called Postscript. Nu was a speaker at the Institute of Noetic Sciences International Conference in July 2017 in Oakland, California.

=== PSI-Posium ===
In 2015, Nu held a three-day conference in Las Vegas called PSI-Posium, in which the position of magic from both the perspective of illusion and reality was discussed and contemplated at length. John B. Alexander, Ph.D., wrote of the conference, "The common theme for the weekend was that real magic is not only possible, it occurs regularly and it is up to the individual to recognize it when it happens. ... Adroit and superbly skilled in their craft, organizers and participants alike both demonstrated established ingenuity and contemplated taking their performances to a higher level. There were a few card tricks shown that entailed either forces or considerable digital dexterity that require a high degree of proficiency. But true to the premise of the seminar it was also indicated that there are times in which neither are required because the operator does get a mental signal. Psychokinesis is one of the more contentious topics in the world of magic. Most stage magicians and scientists claim that mind over matter is simply impossible. They generally discounted offhand demonstrations of 'spoon bending' or psychokinesis metal bending (PKMB). Based on the accomplishments of Uri Geller, aerospace engineer, Jack Houck, developed a process by which regular people could engage in such an experience and called it a PK Party. Rather than watching a performance groups could try it themselves. Displayed at PSI Posium were items that bent totally devoid of physical force by naive subject (non-magicians). A critical point is creating a belief that these things can happen - then they often do. Yes, there are numerous tricks and they can look very authentic. But sometimes, and only on occasion, do macro-psychokinetic event happen that defy explanation."

== Publications ==
- "Alain Nu Penguin Live Lecture"
- "Animalogic by Alain Nu"
- Any Card by Alain Nu
- Asrtologic by Alain Nu
- "Close-Up Sketches by Alain Nu"
- Mind Over Matter by Alain Nu
- "Nu Collection by Alain Nu"
- Nu Sense by Alain Nu
- Nu-Wave Reloaded by Alain Nu
- Psycho-Chronetic by Alain Nu
- Secrets and Realities by Alain Nu
- Serial Thrillers by Alain Nu
- Word Work, Vol 1 & 2 by Alain Nu
- XXX Hardcore Mentalism by Alain Nu

== Bibliography ==
Books by Nu, sold as nonfiction

- State of Mind: The Man Who Knows Reveals The Secrets of Mind Over Matter! CFBP Bestsellers, 2015. ISBN 978-0984208562
- Picture Your ESP!: Reveal Your Hidden Powers With "The Nu ESP Test." CFBP Bestsellers, 2010. ISBN 978-0984208524
