= Sandra Blakeslee =

American science writer

- Born: 1943 (age 82–83)
- Education: University of California, Berkeley (1965)
- Occupation: Science writer
- Children: 2
- Relatives: Howard W. Blakeslee (grandfather)
- Writing career
- Notable awards: Templeton–Cambridge Journalism Fellowship Fellow of the American Association for the Advancement of Science Fellow of the Committee for Skeptical Inquiry
- Website: sandrablakeslee.com

Sandra Blakeslee (born 1943) is an American science correspondent of over four decades for The New York Times and science writer, specializing in neuroscience. Together with neuroscientist V. S. Ramachandran, she authored the 1998 popular science book Phantoms in the Brain: Probing the Mysteries of the Human Mind.

== Biography ==
Blakeslee is the third member of her family to specialize in science writing; her grandfather Howard W. Blakeslee wrote for the Associated Press, and was awarded a Pulitzer Prize for Reporting in 1937, and her father, Alton L. Blakeslee, also wrote for the AP.

Sandra Blakeslee was raised in Port Washington, New York. She attended Northwestern University for two years, before transferring to the University of California, Berkeley, where she majored in political science, graduating in 1965. She then joined the Peace Corps, serving in Sarawak, Borneo, where she taught elementary school.

Blakeslee started at the New York Times United Nations bureau and city desk in 1967, before moving to the science desk in 1968. She later began writing for the Times on contract. In the 1980s, she began to specialize in neuroscience. She co-authored a series of books on marriage and divorce with psychologist Judith Wallerstein.

Starting in 1995, Blakeslee began hosting a writing workshop with fellow Times writer George Johnson at the Santa Fe Institute, which awarded her a journalism fellowship in 2013.

Blakeslee lives in Santa Fe. She has two children. Her son, Matt Blakeslee, is also a science writer, and her co-author on the 2007 book The Body Has a Mind of Its Own: How Body Maps in Your Brain Help You Do (Almost) Everything Better.

== Books ==
- You Don't Have to Live with Cystitis! How to Avoid It—And What to Do About It (1986) with Larry Gillespie
- Second Chances: Men, Women and Children a Decade After Divorce (1989) with Judith Wallerstein
- The Good Marriage: How and Why Love Lasts (1995) with Judith S. Wallerstein
- Helping Your Kids Cope with Divorce the Sandcastles Way (1998) with Patricia Romanowski Bashe and Judith S. Wallerstein
- Phantoms in the Brain: Probing the Mysteries of the Human Mind (1998) with V. S. Ramachandran
- The Unexpected Legacy of Divorce: The 25 Year Landmark Study (2001) with Judith Wallerstein and Julia M. Lewis
- What About the Kids?: Raising Your Children Before, During and After Divorce (2003)
- On Intelligence: How a New Understanding of the Brain will Lead to the Creation of Truly Intelligent Machines (2004) with Jeff Hawkins
- The Body Has a Mind of Its Own: How Body Maps in Your Brain Help You Do (Almost) Everything Better (2007) with Matthew Blakeslee
- Sleights of Mind: What the Neuroscience of Magic Reveals about Our Everyday Deceptions (2010) with Stephen L. Macknik and Susana Martinez-Conde
