= ASAIO Journal =

- Discipline: Biomedical engineering Transplantation Artificial Organs
- Language: English
- Edited by: Pramod Bonde, MD

Publication details
- Former name: Transactions of the American Society for Artificial Internal Organs
- History: 1955–present
- Publisher: Wolters Kluwer on behalf of the American Society for Artificial Internal Organs
- Frequency: Monthly
- Impact factor: 4.2 (2022)

Standard abbreviations
- ISO 4: ASAIO J.

Indexing
- ISSN: 1058-2916 (print); 1538-943X (web)
- LCCN: sn91003426
- OCLC no.: 818973204

Links
- Journal homepage; Online access; Online archive

The ASAIO Journal is a peer-reviewed medical journal covering research and development of artificial organs. It is published by Wolters Kluwer on behalf of the American Society for Artificial Internal Organs (ASAIO) and the editor-in-chief is Mark S. Slaughter, MD (University of Louisville). It was established in 1955 as the Transactions of the American Society for Artificial Internal Organs to publish the proceedings of the annual ASAIO conference. It obtained its current title in 1992. The journal publishes monthly.

The journal offers an open access publication option to authors. In addition, letters to the editors, invited commentaries, case reports, brief communications, and how to do it articles are published free for all to access. All journal content is free to access one year post-publication.

== Editors-in-chief ==
The following persons are or have been editor-in-chief:

- Peter Salisbury, 1955
- George H.A. Clowes 1956
- George Schreiner, 1957–1985
- Eli Friedman, 1986–2003
- Joseph Zwischenberger, 2004–2013
- Mark Slaughter, 2013–2024
- Pramod Bonde, 2025–present

== Abstracting and indexing ==
The journal is abstracted and indexed in:

- Current Contents/Clinical Medicine
- Ei Compendex
- Embase
- Index Medicus/MEDLINE/PubMed
- Science Citation Index,
- Scopus

According to the Journal Citation Reports, the journal has a 2022 impact factor of 4.2.
