= Bevil Conway =

Zimbabwean neuroscientist (born 1974)

- Born: 4 November 1974 (age 52); Salisbury, Rhodesia (now Harare, Zimbabwe)
- Education: McGill University; Harvard University
- Known for: Color research, painting, and printmaking
- Scientific career
- Fields: Neuroscience

Bevil Conway (born 1974), is a Zimbabwean neuroscientist, visual artist, and an expert in color. Conway specialises in visual perception in his scientific work, and he often explores the limitations of the visual system in his artwork. At Wellesley College, Conway was Knafel Assistant Professor of Natural Science from 2007 to 2011, and associate professor of Neuroscience until 2016. He was a founding member of the Neuroscience Department at Wellesley. Prior to joining the Wellesley faculty, Conway helped establish the Kathmandu University Medical School in Nepal, where he taught as assistant professor in 2002–03. He currently runs the Sensation, Cognition and Action Unit in the Laboratory of Sensorimotor Research at the National Eye Institute and the National Institute of Mental Health.

Conway was educated at McGill University and Harvard University. On finishing his PhD and post-doctoral work under Margaret Livingstone and David Hubel, Conway was elected a Junior Fellow at the Harvard Society of Fellows, and spent a year as an Alexander von Humboldt Fellow at the University of Bremen, Germany. Conway has held grants from the National Science Foundation, the National Institutes of Health, the Whitehall Foundation, and the Radcliffe Institute for Advanced Study.

== Science ==
Conway's research originally set out to explore the principle of double opponency in the primate visual system, showing (in 2001 and 2006) that color cells in the first stage of cortical processing (V1) compute local ratios of cone activity, making them both color-opponent (red-green and blue-yellow) and spatially opponent, pinning them down as the likely basis for color constancy and the brain's building blocks for constructing hue.

Subsequent work has focused on the representation of color in extrastriate areas of the brain that receive input from V1. In collaboration with Doris Tsao, he used fMRI to identify such functionally defined regions and coined the term "globs" to describe them. In 2007 he used targeted single-unit recording techniques to characterise the behaviour of cells in these color areas, showing that individual neurons in these areas respond selectively to specific hues. The behaviour of these cells and the networks they are involved in are the current focus of his work. By comparing the responses to colors, faces, bodies, places, and objects, Conway's work uncovered the multi-stage parallel processing organization of inferior temporal cortex. This work suggests that IT implements a set of canonical operations in parallel: in Conway's framework, the face-patch network is simply one manifestation of the operations carried out by IT. In a 2023 opinion essay, Conway and his coauthors rendered their final judgement: “the [Opponent Colors] theory is wrong”.

Conway's scientific account of #thedress has become the standard account of the phenomenon. Empirical work by Conway and Ted Gibson on how languages name colors provided evidence that reconciled relativist and universalist accounts, connecting color perception to behavior.

== Art ==
Much of Conway's research is guided by the underlying thought that visual art can be used to reveal insights about how visual information is processed. An ongoing research project examines the idea that poor stereopsis may be an asset to artists (the startling finding that Rembrandt may have lacked stereopsis was widely discussed in the media). His interest in the dove-tailing of science and art has also spawned an interdisciplinary upper level course at Wellesley, Vision and Art: Physics, Physiology, Perception, and Practice. Conway has promoted engagement of museums with neuroscience, serving as an advisor to the Peabody Essex Museum in the PEM neuroscience initiative.

As an artist Conway is active in visual media, predominantly watercolors, oils, and prints. He is regularly a visiting artist at the Columbus College of Art and Design. A larger, ongoing project is a series of sculptures in the shape of glass boxes. His interest is driven by fundamental questions of art making: How do brain and visual apparatus co-operate in making an art object? What is the role of muscle memory in making marks on paper and, more broadly, in the creative process? How do artists challenge the constraints and limitations of our visual system? His works are in the collection of the Fogg Art Museum, private collections in Europe, North America and Africa, and have been featured in books and commercials.
