= Michelle Albert =

American physician

Michelle Asha Albert
- Education: Haverford College; University of Rochester; Harvard T.H. Chan School of Public Health
- Scientific career
- Institutions: University of California, San Francisco; Harvard Medical School; Howard University; Columbia University

Michelle Asha Albert is an American cardiologist who is the Walter A. Haas Lucie-Stern Endowed Chair in Cardiology and professor of medicine at the University of California, San Francisco. Albert is a past president of the American Heart Association, the Association of Black Cardiologists and of the Association of University Cardiologists. She is an elected member of the National Academy of Medicine, the American Society of Clinical Investigators and the Association of American Physicians.

== Education ==
Albert attended Haverford College, where she studied chemistry and graduated at the age of twenty. She attended medical school at the University of Rochester. Albert did internal medicine residency and also served as chief internal medicine resident at Columbia University Presbyterian Hospital, NY. She did her clinical and research cardiology fellowship at Brigham and Women’s Hospital and Harvard Medical School. Albert attended the Harvard T.H. Chan School of Public Health, where she earned a Master of Public Health.

== Research and career ==
After cardiology fellowship, Albert was appointed to the faculty at Harvard Medical School. She was eventually appointed Associate Professor of Medicine. Albert subsequently served as Chief of Cardiology and the Vivian Beaumont Allen Endowed Professor at Howard University. Thereafter, she joined the faculty at the University of California, San Francisco. Albert's research considers the relationship of molecular biomarkers as well as adversity in cardiovascular disease risk.

== Awards and honours ==
- 2004 Association of Black Cardiologists Herbert W. Nickens Epidemiology Award
- 2010 Brigham and Women's Hospital Nesson Fellowship Award
- 2012 American College of Cardiology Heart of Women's Health CREDO Award
- 2014 Women's Day Magazine Red Dress Award Honoree
- 2015 Haverford College Haverford Award
- 2016 American Heart Association Women in Cardiology Mentoring Award
- 2016 Elected Member of the Association of University Cardiologists
- 2018 Association of Black Cardiologists Daniel D. Savage Science Award
- 2018 American Heart Association Merit Award
- 2019 Elected member of the American Society for Clinical Investigation
- 2020 American Heart Association Population Science Research Award
- 2020 American Heart Association COVID-19 Rapid Track Science Award
- 2023 University of Rochester Honorary Doctor of Science
- 2023 Elected Member, Association of American Physicians
- 2023 American Heart Association, Distinguished National Leadership Award
- 2023 American Heart Association, Distinguished Epidemiology Achievement Award

== Selected publications ==
- M A Albert; E Danielson; N Rifai; P M Ridker (4 July 2001). "Effect of statin therapy on C-reactive protein levels: the pravastatin inflammation/CRP evaluation (PRINCE): a randomized trial and cohort study". JAMA. 286 (1): 64–70. doi:10.1001/JAMA.286.1.64. ISSN 0098-7484. PMID 11434828. Wikidata Q28186001.
- Mercedes R Carnethon; Jia Pu; George Howard; et al. (23 October 2017). "Cardiovascular Health in African Americans: A Scientific Statement From the American Heart Association". Circulation. 136 (21): e393–e423. doi:10.1161/CIR.0000000000000534. ISSN 0009-7322. PMID 29061565. Wikidata Q46813797.
- Donna K Arnett; Roger S Blumenthal; Michelle A Albert; et al. (17 March 2019). "2019 ACC/AHA Guideline on the Primary Prevention of Cardiovascular Disease: A Report of the American College of Cardiology/American Heart Association Task Force on Clinical Practice Guidelines". Circulation. 140 (11): e596–e646. doi:10.1161/CIR.0000000000000678. ISSN 0009-7322. PMID 30879355. Wikidata Q92416957. (erratum)
