= Edith Irby Jones =

American physician (1927–2019)

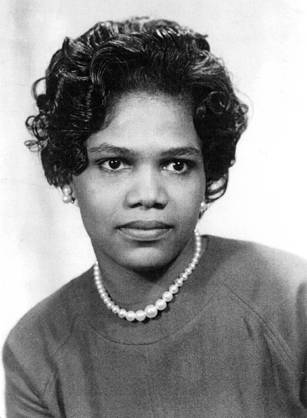
- Born: Edith Mae Irby; December 23, 1927 near Conway, Arkansas, US
- Died: July 15, 2019 (aged 91); Houston, Texas, US
- Occupation: Physician
- Years active: 1952–2019
- Known for: First African-American student to attend a racially mixed class in the Southern United States (1948)

Edith Mae Irby Jones (December 23, 1927 – July 15, 2019) was an American physician who was the first woman president of the National Medical Association and a founding member of the Association of Black Cardiologists. She was honored by many awards, including induction into both the University of Arkansas College of Medicine Hall of Fame and the inaugural group of women inducted into the Arkansas Women's Hall of Fame. She was the first African American to be accepted as a non-segregated student at the University of Arkansas for Medical Sciences and the first Black student to attend racially mixed classes in the American South. She was the first African American to graduate from a southern medical school, first Black intern in the state of Arkansas, and later first Black intern at Baylor College of Medicine.

== Biography ==
Edith Mae Irby was born on December 23, 1927, near Conway in Faulkner County, Arkansas, to Mattie (née Buice) and Robert Irby. Her childhood was difficult: at the age of eight, she lost her father; an older sister died at 12 years of age from typhoid fever; and Irby herself suffered from rheumatic fever as a child. These events inspired her desire to help those who were underserved and impoverished and catalyzed her toward a career in medicine. Her mother relocated the family to Hot Springs, where Irby graduated in 1944 from Langston Secondary School (named for leader John Mercer Langston).

After winning a scholarship to Knoxville College in Knoxville, Tennessee, she studied chemistry, biology and physics. Irby believed she had an important role and obligation to the Black community. One of her teachers had helped her attain the scholarship, members of the local African-American community collected change, and the Black press ran a campaign in the Arkansas State Press to raise funds that they donated to her for her tuition and living expenses. During her schooling, she secretly made trips with teams from the NAACP to recruit members for the organization. She graduated with her BS from Knoxville College in 1948 and completed a graduate course at Northwestern University in Evanston, Illinois to prepare for Medical School.

"I hope to make a record that will reflect to the honor of my race and that will obviously show that we only want to be accorded the rights deserved by human beings and good American citizens."

— The Pittsburgh Courier, 9 October 1948

That same year, she was admitted to the University of Arkansas Medical School, as part of a racially mixed class, and made headlines across the United States from New York to Oregon to North Dakota to Texas. She was the first African-American woman to be accepted in any school in the Southern United States, enrolling seven months after Silas Herbert Hunt enrolled in the University of Arkansas School of Law. The news of her enrollment was carried in September 1948 in The Crisis, Life Magazine's January 31, 1949 issue, the January 1949 edition of Ebony, and other national publications, including Time and The Washington Post. Although admitted to the school, Jones had to deal with racial discrimination, such as being forced to use separate facilities from whites for housing and dining.

During her second year of school, Irby married Dr. James B. Jones, a professor at the medical school. They had three children together. In 1952, Jones received her Doctor of Medicine degree, the first African-American graduate from University of Arkansas for Medical Sciences. She was accepted to complete the first residency by an African American at a hospital in Arkansas.

== Career ==
Upon her graduation, Jones returned to Hot Springs and practiced medicine there for six years. When tension over the Little Rock Nine polarized Arkansas, and newspapers began to spotlight her again, in 1959 she and her family moved to Houston, Texas. She was accepted as the first Black woman intern at the Baylor College of Medicine Affiliated Hospitals. Because the hospital staff was segregated and there were limited patient rosters in Texas, she completed her last three months of residency at Freedman's Hospital in Washington, D.C.

In 1962, she founded a private practice in Houston's "Third Ward", to help those who could not access care elsewhere. That same year, she became chief of cardiology at St. Elizabeth's Hospital in Houston. She also became an associate chief of medicine at Riverside General Hospital. In 1963, she accepted a post as a Clinical Assistant Professor at Baylor College of Medicine. Continuing her education, Jones completed graduate courses at the West Virginia College of Medicine in 1965 and the Cook County Graduate School of Medicine in Chicago in 1966.

In 1964, Jones was elected to serve as second vice president of the National Medical Association (NMA). In 1975, she became the first woman to chair the Council on Scientific Assembly for the NMA; a decade later, she was elected as the first woman president of the organization. Jones also supervised residents at the University of Texas Health Science Center.

== Campaigning ==
Jones was a charter member of the group who formed Physicians for Human Rights. She was active on the boards of Planned Parenthood and the Houston Independent School District. In 1974 she was one of the founding members of the Association of Black Cardiologists.

Jones was an activist for civil rights, working with Dr. Martin Luther King Jr. as part of the civil rights movement. She was a member of what was known as the "Freedom Four", who spoke across the South in homes and churches encouraging people to join the civil rights movement. Jones was the only physician and only woman in the group; the others were attorneys Floyd Davis, Robert Booker, and Harold Flowers.

== Awards, honors and recognition ==
In 1969, Jones was honored by the Houston Chapter of Theta Sigma Phi professional women with the Matrix Award for Medicine.

In 1986, Edith Irby Jones Day was proclaimed by the City of Houston. In 1988 she was named Internist of the Year by the American Society of Internal Medicine. She was one of the founders of Mercy Hospital in Houston and one of the 12 physician owners and developers of the Park Plaza Hospital.

Throughout her career, Jones received many awards and honors for both her professional and volunteer work, including honorary doctorates from Missouri Valley College (1988), Mary Holmes College (1989), Lindenwood College (1991), Knoxville College (1992), and the University of Houston (2013). Memorial Hospital Southeast renamed its ambulatory center in her honor (1998). She was the recipient of the 2001 Oscar E. Edwards Memorial Award for Volunteerism and Community Service from the American College of Physicians, and she was inducted into the University of Arkansas College of Medicine Hall of Fame (2004). US Congresswoman Sheila Jackson Lee nominated Jones as a Local Legend for the National Library of Medicine. She was in the inaugural class of inductees into the Arkansas Women's Hall of Fame in 2015, and received a commendation from the Texas House of Representatives for her service that same year. Two international hospitals are named in her honor: Dr. Edith Irby Jones Clinic in Vaudreuil, Haiti, which she helped found in 1991, and the Dr. Edith Irby Jones Emergency Clinic in Veracruz, Mexico.

== Death ==
Jones died at age 91 on July 15, 2019, in Houston. Her remains are buried in Greenwood Cemetery in Hot Springs, Garland County, Arkansas.

== Bibliography ==
- More, Ellen S. (1999). Restoring the balance: women physicians and the profession of medicine, 1850–1995 (2nd printing ed.). Cambridge, Massachusetts: Harvard University Press. ISBN 0-674-76661-X.
- Smith, Jessie Carney, ed. (1996). Notable Black American Women. Vol. II. New York, New York: VNR AG. ISBN 978-0-8103-9177-2.
