= The dress =

Viral phenomenon regarding the colour of a dress

The original photograph of the dress

The dress was a 2015 online viral phenomenon centred on a photograph of a dress. Viewers disagreed on whether the dress was blue and black or white and gold. The phenomenon revealed differences in human colour perception and became the subject of scientific investigations into neuroscience and vision science.

The phenomenon originated in a photograph of a dress posted on the social networking platform Facebook. The dress was black and blue, but the conditions of the photograph caused many to perceive it as white and gold, creating debate. Within a week, more than ten million tweets had mentioned the dress. The retailer of the dress, Roman Originals, reported a surge in sales and produced a one-off version in white and gold sold for charity.

== Origin ==
In February 2015, about a week before the wedding of Grace and Keir Johnston of Colonsay, Scotland, the bride's mother, Cecilia Bleasdale, took a photograph of a dress at Cheshire Oaks Designer Outlet north of Chester, England. Bleasdale had intended to wear the dress at the wedding and sent the photograph to Grace. The dress was coloured blue with black lace. However, Grace told her mother she perceived it in the photograph as white with gold lace.

After Grace posted the photograph on Facebook, her friends also disagreed; some saw it as white with gold stripes, while others saw it as blue with black stripes. For a week, the debate became well known in Colonsay, a small island community.

On the day of the wedding, Caitlin McNeill, a friend of the bride and groom, performed with her band at the wedding. Even after seeing that the dress was "obviously blue and black" in reality, the musicians remained preoccupied by the photograph. They said they almost failed to make it on stage because they were caught up discussing the dress. A few days later, on 26 February, McNeill reposted the image to her blog on Tumblr, creating further public discussion surrounding the image.

== Response ==
=== Initial viral spread ===
The most interesting thing to me is that it traveled. It went from New York media circle-jerk Twitter to international. And you could see it in my Twitter notifications because people started having conversations in, like, Spanish and Portuguese and then Japanese and Chinese and Thai and Arabic. It was amazing to watch this move from a local thing to, like, a massive international phenomenon.

— Cates Holderness

Cates Holderness, who ran the Tumblr page for BuzzFeed at the site's New York offices, received a message from McNeill asking for help resolving the colour dispute of the dress. She dismissed it, but checked the page near the end of her workday and saw that it had received around 5,000 notes, a large amount for Tumblr. Tom Christ, Tumblr's director of data, said that, at its peak, the page was receiving 14,000 views a second (or 840,000 views per minute), well over the normal rates. Later that night, the number of notes increased tenfold.

Holderness showed the picture to other members of the BuzzFeed social media team, who immediately began arguing about the dress colours. She created a simple poll for Tumblr users, then left work and took the subway home. When she got off the train and checked her phone, it was overwhelmed by messages. That evening, the page set a new record at BuzzFeed for concurrent visitors and eventually peaked at 673,000.

The image became a worldwide Internet meme across social media. On Twitter, users created the hashtags "#whiteandgold", "#blueandblack", and "#dressgate" to discuss their opinions on what the colour of the dress was and theories surrounding their arguments. The number of tweets about the dress increased throughout the night; at 11:36 pm GMT, when the first increase in the number of tweets about the dress occurred, there were five thousand tweets per minute using the hashtag "#TheDress", increasing to 11,000 tweets per minute with the hashtag by 1:31 am GMT. The photo also attracted discussion relating to the triviality of the matter as a whole; The Washington Post described the dispute as "[the] drama that divided a planet". Some articles humorously suggested that the dress could prompt an existential crisis over the nature of sight and reality, or that the debate could harm interpersonal relationships. Others examined why people were making such a big argument over a seemingly trivial matter.

=== Overnight popularity ===
On the evening BuzzFeed posted the article, the Wellesley College neuroscientist Bevil Conway gave some comments about the phenomenon to the Wired reporter Adam Rogers. Before they hung up, Rogers warned him, "Your tomorrow will not be the same." Conway thought he was exaggerating. Rogers's story eventually received 32.8 million unique visitors. When Conway woke up the next morning, his inbox had so many emails he initially thought it had been hacked, until he saw that most were interview requests from major media organisations. "I did 10 interviews and had to have a colleague take my class that day," said Conway.

Celebrities with larger Twitter followings began to comment. A tweet by the American songwriter Taylor Swift, in which she shared she saw the dress as blue and black and said she was "confused and scared", was retweeted 111,134 times and liked 154,188 times. Jaden Smith, Frankie Muniz, Demi Lovato, Mindy Kaling, and Justin Bieber saw the dress as blue and black, while Anna Kendrick, B. J. Novak, Katy Perry, Julianne Moore, and Sarah Hyland saw it as white and gold. Kim Kardashian tweeted that she saw it as white and gold, while her then-husband Kanye West saw it as blue and black. Lucy Hale, Phoebe Tonkin, and Katie Nolan saw different colour schemes at different times. Lady Gaga described the dress as "periwinkle and sand", while David Duchovny called it teal. Other celebrities, including Ellen DeGeneres and Ariana Grande, mentioned the dress on social media without mentioning specific colours. Politicians, government agencies and social media platforms of major brands also wrote humorous posts. Ultimately, the dress was the subject of 4.4 million tweets within 24 hours.

The dress was designed and manufactured by Roman Originals. In the UK, where the phenomenon had begun, Ian Johnson, creative manager for Roman Originals, learned of the controversy from his Facebook news feed that morning. "I was pretty gobsmacked. I just laughed and told the wife that I'd better get to work," he said. TV presenter Alex Jones wore the dress on that night's edition of The One Show.

We've seen other stories go viral, but the sheer diversity of outlets that picked it up and were talking about it was unlike anything we had ever seen. Everyone from QVC to Warner Bros. to local public libraries to Red Cross affiliates were all posting links to it on their social accounts. That kind of diversity in who's sharing a story pretty much never happens ... and certainly never to that degree. Even in the year since and with a million different people trying to replicate it, nothing has come close.

— Brandon Silverman, CEO of social media monitoring site CrowdTangle

Businesses that had nothing to do with the dress, or even the clothing industry, devoted social media attention to the phenomenon. Adobe retweeted another Twitter user who had used some of the company's apps to isolate the dress's colours. "We jumped in the conversation and thought, Let's see what happens," recalled Karen Do, the company's senior manager for social media. Jenna Bromberg, a digital brand manager for Pizza Hut, saw the dress as white and gold and quickly sent out a tweet with a picture of pizza noting that it, too, was the same colours. Do called it "a tweet heard around the world".

Ben Fischer of the New York Business Journal reported that interest in the first BuzzFeed article about the dress exhibited vertical growth instead of the typical bell curve of a viral phenomenon, leading BuzzFeed to assign two editorial teams to generate additional articles about the dress to drive ad revenue, and, by 1 March, the original BuzzFeed article had received over 37 million views. The dress was cited by CNN commentator Mel Robbins as a viral phenomenon having the requisite qualities of positivity bias incorporating "awe, laughter and amusement" and was compared to and contrasted with a story about escaped llamas in an Arizona retirement community earlier that day, as well as to tributes paid to actor Leonard Nimoy after his death the following day.

=== Real colours of dress confirmed ===
The dress was confirmed as a royal blue "Lace Bodycon Dress" from the retailer Roman Originals. The dress is black and blue; although it was available in three other colours (red, pink, and ivory, each with black lace), a white and gold version was not available at the time. The day after McNeill's post, Roman Originals' website experienced a major surge in traffic and sold out of the dress within 30 minutes.

On 28 February 2015, Roman Originals announced that they would make a single white and gold dress for a Comic Relief charity auction.

By 1 March 2015, over two-thirds of BuzzFeed users polled responded that the dress was white and gold.

On 3 March 2015, the Johnstons, Bleasdale, and MacNeill appeared as guests on The Ellen DeGeneres Show in the United States. The presenter, Ellen DeGeneres, presented each of them with gifts of underwear patterned after the dress and combining both colour schemes. The show sponsors also gave the Johnstons a gift of US$10,000 (equivalent to $14,000 in 2025) and a honeymoon trip to Grenada, as they had left their honeymoon early to participate in the show.

Some people have suggested that the dress changes colours on its own. Media outlets noted that the photo was overexposed and had poor white balance, causing its colours to be washed out, giving rise to the perception by some that the dress is white and gold. Experts have noted that when photographed properly, the dress is "indisputably blue and black", but that the "strange lighting" in the controversial photo made the colours appear to be white and gold, respectively.

== Scientific explanations ==
Two ways in which the photograph of the dress may be perceived: blue and black under a yellow-tinted illumination (left figure) or; white and gold under a blue-tinted illumination (right figure).

There is no consensus on why the dress elicits such discordant perceptions. The neuroscientists Bevil Conway and Jay Neitz believe they are a result of how the human brain perceives colour and chromatic adaptation. Conway believes it is connected to how the brain processes the various hues of a daylight sky: "Your visual system is looking at this thing, and you're trying to discount the chromatic bias of the daylight axis ... people either discount the blue side, in which case they end up seeing white and gold, or discount the gold side, in which case they end up with blue and black." Neitz said:

Our visual system is supposed to throw away information about the illuminant and extract information about the actual reflectance ... but I've studied individual differences in colour vision for 30 years, and this is one of the biggest individual differences I've ever seen.

Similar theories have been expounded by the University of Liverpool's Paul Knox, who stated that what the brain interprets as colour may be affected by the device the photograph is viewed on, or the viewer's own expectations. Anya Hurlbert and collaborators also considered the problem from the perspective of colour perception. They attributed the differences in perception to individual perception of colour constancy.

The neuroscientist and psychologist Pascal Wallisch states that while inherently ambiguous stimuli have been known to vision science for many years, this is the first such stimulus in the colour domain that was brought to the attention of science by social media. He attributes differential perceptions to differences in illumination and fabric priors, but also notes that the stimulus is highly unusual insofar as the perception of most people does not switch. If it does, it does so only on very long time scales, which is highly unusual for bistable stimuli, so perceptual learning might be at play. In addition, he says that discussions of this stimulus are not frivolous, as the stimulus is both of interest to science and a paradigmatic case of how different people can sincerely see the world differently. Daniel Hardiman-McCartney of the College of Optometrists stated that the picture was ambiguous, suggesting that the illusion was caused by a strong yellow light shining onto the dress, and human perception of the colours of the dress and light source by comparing them with other colours and objects in the picture. The philosopher Barry C. Smith compared the phenomenon with Ludwig Wittgenstein and the rabbit–duck illusion, although the rabbit-duck illusion is an ambiguous image where, for most people, the alternative perceptions switch very easily.

The Journal of Vision, a scientific journal about vision research, announced in March 2015 that a special issue about the dress would be published with the title A Dress Rehearsal for Vision Science. The first large-scale scientific study on the dress was published in Current Biology three months after the image went viral. The study, which involved 1,400 respondents, found that 57 per cent saw the dress as blue and black, 30 per cent saw it as white and gold, 11 per cent saw it as blue and brown, and two per cent reported it as "other". Women and older people disproportionately saw the dress as white and gold. The researchers further found that, if the dress was shown in artificial yellow-coloured lighting, almost all respondents saw the dress as black and blue, while they saw it as white and gold if the simulated lighting had a blue bias. Another study in the Journal of Vision, by Pascal Wallisch, found that people who were early risers were more likely to think the dress was lit by natural light, perceiving it as white and gold, and that "night owls" saw the dress as blue and black.

A study carried out by Schlaffke et al. reported that individuals who saw the dress as white and gold showed increased activity in the frontal and parietal regions of the brain. These areas are thought to be critical in higher cognition activities such as top-down modulation in visual perception.

== Legacy ==
The dress was included on multiple year-end lists of notable Internet memes in 2015. As the original authors of the photograph that sparked the viral phenomenon, Bleasdale and her partner Paul Jinks later expressed frustration and regret over being "completely left out from the story", including their lack of control over the story, the omission of their role in the discovery, and the commercial use of the photograph. In South Africa, the Salvation Army used the dress in a 2015 campaign to raise awareness of domestic violence, with the slogan: "Why is it so hard to see black and blue?"

== See also ==
- Checker shadow illusion
- List of individual dresses
- List of Internet phenomena
- Yanny or Laurel
