= American Society for Artificial Internal Organs =

American Society for Artificial Internal Organs (ASAIO) is an organization of individuals and groups that are interested in artificial internal organs and their development.

It supports research into artificial internal organs and holds an annual meeting, which attracts industry, researchers and government officials. ASAIO's most heavily represented areas are nephrology, cardiopulmonary devices (artificial hearts, heart-lung machines) and biomaterials. It publishes a peer-reviewed publication, the ASAIO Journal, 10 times a year.
