= Glob (visual system) =

Globs are millimeter-sized color modules found beyond the visual area V2 in the brain's color processing ventral (also known as parvocellular) pathway. They are scattered throughout the posterior inferior temporal cortex in an area called the V4 complex. They are clustered by color preference, and organized as color columns. They are the first part of the brain in which color is processed in terms of the full range of hues found in color space.

The term "glob" was proposed by Bevil Conway and Doris Tsao on an analogy with the cytochrome-oxidase blobs of V1, an earlier stage in the hierarchical elaboration of color. This also distinguishes them from other types of modules found elsewhere in the cerebral cortex such as face patches, and inferior temporal feature columns.

== Properties ==
Globs are found in the V4 complex, a region in the inferior temporal cortex, forward of area V3.This complex includes areas V4, the dorsal part of the posterior inferior temporal cortex and the rear part of the inferior temporal near the occipital lobe known as TEO. Their neurons are not restricted to a single color preference. Neurons in adjacent glob cells have similar color tuning and form clusters that are arranged spatially within the cortex. In between them are ‘‘interglob’’ areas that were not color sensitive but respond to shape.

The color-tuned neurons are arranged in color columns that are of a finer scale than single globs. These columns are between 50 and 100 μm in size. Color preferences of neurons recorded sequentially along given columns are arranged according to a chromotopic map that reflects perceptual color space.

They are studied using functional MRI and single-unit recording.

== Color perception ==
Three types of retinal cone create signals that get transformed in the visual pathway to create the perception of color. However the neurons processing them in the retina, lateral geniculate nucleus, and V1 and V2 early parts of the visual cortex encode using the opponent process only a limited range of colors that does not reflect the dimensions of perceptual color space. It is only the next area where globs are found that along the visual processing hierarchy, show hue sensitivity, with the population of neurons representing most (if not all) of perceptual color space and which the color responses of neurons correspond to perception.
