= Margaret Livingstone =

American neuroscientist

- Born: April 3, 1950 (age 76); Danville, Virginia
- Education: MIT; Harvard University
- Awards: Mika Salpeter Lifetime Achievement Award (2011); Member, American Academy of Arts and Sciences (2015); Elected, National Academy of Sciences (2020)
- Scientific career
- Thesis: Monoamines in the lobster: Biochemistry, anatomy, and possible functional role (1981)
- Doctoral advisor: Edward Kravitz
- Doctoral students: Stephen Macknik; Doris Tsao; Bevil Conway

Margaret Stratford Livingstone is the Takeda Professor of Neurobiology in the Department of Neurobiology at Harvard Medical School in the field of visual perception. She authored the book Vision and Art: The Biology of Seeing. She was elected a member of the American Academy of Arts and Sciences in 2015 and was elected to the National Academy of Sciences in 2020.

== Education and career ==
Livingstone was born in Virginia, started college at Duke University and then transferred to Massachusetts Institute of Technology where she received her undergraduate degree in 1972. In 1981 she earned her Ph.D. from Harvard University. Following her Ph.D. she worked as a visiting fellow at Princeton University and then was a postdoctoral fellow under David H. Hubel at Harvard University. In 1983 she became an assistant professor at Harvard Medical School, and in 1988 she was promoted to professor, and in 2014 she was named the Takeda Professor of Neurobiology.

== Research ==
Livingstone's early research was on neurons that respond to serotonin, which she conducted by using lobsters as a model organism. She went on to examine the visual responses in cats, monkeys, and how primates sense color. Her research provides insight into how mammals perceive form and movement, the physiological details leading to dyslexia, and the region of the brain used to identify faces.

== Allegations of animal cruelty ==
In 2022, following Livingston's election as a member of the National Academy of Sciences, she published an inaugural article in the Proceedings of the National Academy of Sciences titled Triggers for Mother Love, in which she described the reactions of monkey mothers to being given a stuffed toy after the removal of their baby. This drew attention to her research on vision with monkey infants, which included suturing the eyelids of two monkeys shut.

In response, a group of over 250 scientists sent a letter to the Proceedings of the National Academy of Sciences to request retraction of the article. PETA also asked for retraction of the article, and asked that Livingston's work be defunded. In a response statement, Harvard Medical School defended the value of Livingston's work.

In 2023, members of the Animal Law & Policy Clinic at Harvard Law School and the Wild Mind Labs at the University of St. Andrews wrote a letter, signed by over 380 researchers, asking the National Institute of Health to stop funding Livingstone's research with monkeys.

== Selected publications ==
- Livingstone, M. S.; Hubel, D. H. (1984-01-01). "Anatomy and physiology of a color system in the primate visual cortex". Journal of Neuroscience. 4 (1): 309–356. doi:10.1523/JNEUROSCI.04-01-00309.1984. ISSN 0270-6474. PMC 6564760. PMID 6198495. S2CID 15340643.
- Livingstone, M. S.; Hubel, D. H. (1987-11-01). "Psychophysical evidence for separate channels for the perception of form, color, movement, and depth". Journal of Neuroscience. 7 (11): 3416–3468. doi:10.1523/JNEUROSCI.07-11-03416.1987. ISSN 0270-6474. PMC 6569044. PMID 3316524. S2CID 15485966.
- Livingstone, Margaret; Hubel, David (1988-05-06). "Segregation of Form, Color, Movement, and Depth: Anatomy, Physiology, and Perception". Science. 240 (4853): 740–749. Bibcode:1988Sci...240..740L. doi:10.1126/science.3283936. ISSN 0036-8075. PMID 3283936.
- Livingstone, M S; Rosen, G D; Drislane, F W; Galaburda, A M (1991-09-15). "Physiological and anatomical evidence for a magnocellular defect in developmental dyslexia". Proceedings of the National Academy of Sciences. 88 (18): 7943–7947. Bibcode:1991PNAS...88.7943L. doi:10.1073/pnas.88.18.7943. ISSN 0027-8424. PMC 52421. PMID 1896444.
- Livingstone, Margaret (25 March 2014). Vision and art : the biology of seeing. Harry N. Abrams. ISBN 978-1-4197-0692-9. OCLC 828416672.
- Tsao, Doris Y.; Freiwald, Winrich A.; Tootell, Roger B. H.; Livingstone, Margaret S. (2006-02-03). "A Cortical Region Consisting Entirely of Face-Selective Cells". Science. 311 (5761): 670–674. Bibcode:2006Sci...311..670T. doi:10.1126/science.1119983. ISSN 0036-8075. PMC 2678572. PMID 16456083.

== Awards and honors ==
In 2011, the Society for Neuroscience awarded Livingstone the Mika Salpeter Lifetime Achievement Award. In 2015 she was elected to the American Academy of Arts and Sciences, and in 2020 she was elected to the United States' National Academy of Sciences. In 2024 she shared the Rosenstiel Award with Winrich Freiwald, Nancy Kanwisher, and Doris Tsao, for their work on how the brains of humans and other primates respond to faces.
