= Doris Tsao =

American neuroscientist

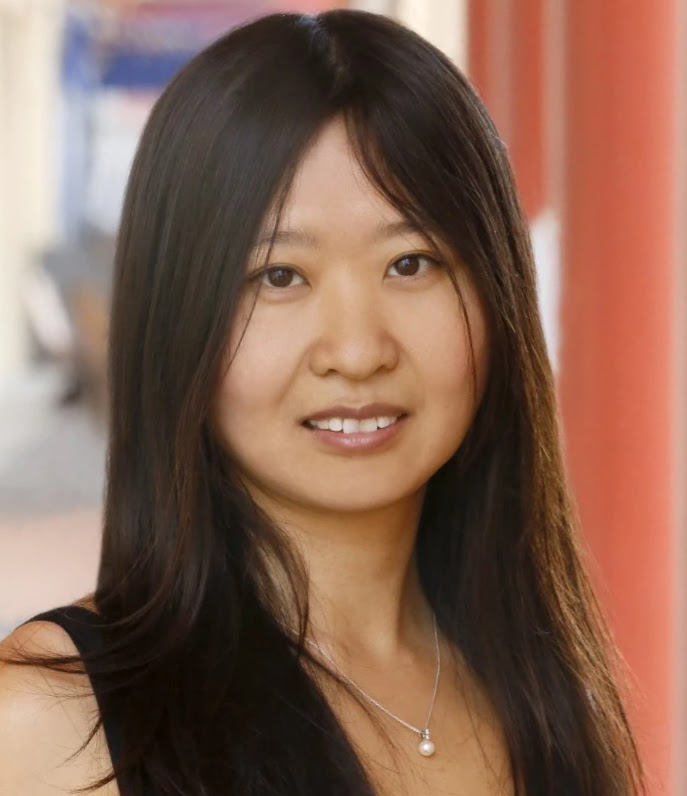
- Born: Changzhou, China
- Citizenship: American
- Education: California Institute of Technology (BS); Harvard University (PhD)
- Known for: Face perception
- Awards: Sofia Kovalevskaya Award (2004); Eppendorf & Science Prize (2006); MIT Technology Review TR35 (2007); John Merck Scholar (2009); Klingenstein Scholar (2009); NARSAD Young Investigator (2009); Searle Scholar (2009); Alfred P. Sloan Research Fellowship (2009); NSF CAREER Award (2009); Presidential Early Career Award for Scientists and Engineers (2010); NIH Director's Pioneer Award (2012); Golden Brain Award (2014); W. Alden Spencer Award (2016); Perl-UNC Prize (2018); MacArthur Fellows Program (2018); National Academy of Sciences (2020); Karl Spencer Lashley Award (2020); Kavli Prize (2024); Rosenstiel Award (2024)
- Scientific career
- Fields: Neuroscience; Visual perception
- Workplaces: University of California, Berkeley
- Thesis: Stereopsis (2002)
- Doctoral advisor: Margaret Livingstone

Doris Ying Tsao is an American neuroscientist and professor of neurobiology and molecular cell biology at the University of California, Berkeley. She was formerly on the faculty at the California Institute of Technology for 12 years. She is recognized for pioneering the use of fMRI with single-unit electrophysiological recordings and for discovering the macaque face patch system for face perception. She is a Howard Hughes Medical Institute Investigator and the director of the T&C Chen Center for Systems Neuroscience. She won a MacArthur "Genius" fellowship in 2018. Tsao was elected a member of the National Academy of Sciences in 2020. In 2024 she was awarded a Kavli Prize in neuroscience along with Nancy Kanwisher and Winrich Freiwald for the discovery and study of specific areas in the brain that perform facial recognition. In 2024, Tsao received the Rosenstiel Award. After joining UC Berkeley in 2021, her current research explores visual perception in primates in order to understand how the brain creates our sense of reality.

== Early life and education ==
Tsao was born in Changzhou, China before her family immigrated to the United States when she was four. She grew up in College Park, Maryland and attended Springbrook High School. Her interest in science and in visual neuroscience in particular was inspired by the Feynman Lectures and Kant's Critique of Pure Reason. She completed her B.S. in biology and mathematics in just three years at Caltech in 1996. She then worked with Margaret Livingstone at the Harvard Medical School, where she received her PhD in neuroscience in 2002 and continued to work as a postdoctoral fellow. In 2004 she received the Sofia Kovalevskaya Award from the Humboldt Foundation, which allowed her to start her own independent research group at the University of Bremen in Germany from 2004 to 2008. In 2009 she joined the faculty at Caltech to teach biology, where she also became a Leadership Chair of the Tianqiao and Chrissy Chen Center for Systems Neuroscience. She went on to join the Allen Institute for Brain Science symposium in 2010.

== Career and research ==
As a PhD student working with Margaret Livingstone, Tsao began by studying stereopsis in macaques using single-unit electrophysiological recordings. She then became interested in using fMRI, a technique usually used to visualize the activity of brain areas in humans, to image brain regions in macaques. She collaborated with Roger Tootell to use fMRI to image brain regions involved in depth perception, and then collaborated with Winrich Freiwald, a postdoctoral fellow working with Nancy Kanwisher at MIT, to combine single-unit electrophysiology with fMRI to study face perception in macaques. Similar to the fusiform face area identified in humans with, they discovered a series of small brain areas, referred to as the macaque face patch system, that contain neurons which are selectively activated by faces. Tsao and her lab have continued to make significant advances in understanding the specific facial features that cause neurons in these face patches to be activated. In 2017, her lab "cracked the code" of how our brains recognize faces, identifying the feature dimensions that cause face-selective neurons in different face patches of the IT cortex to respond to faces. Thus, the images of faces presented to the monkeys could be precisely reconstructed from face-selective neurons' activity.

Tsao was named in MIT Technology Review's TR35 list in 2007. She is serving on the Advisory Committee to the NIH Director (BRAIN Initiative Working Group 2.0) established in 2018, the group that advises on allocation of $1.511 billion toward neuroscience research.

== Publications ==
Doris Tsao has authored or co-authored numerous influential publications in the field of neuroscience, particularly in the areas of visual perception and the neural basis of cognition. Among Dr. Doris Tsao's extensive body of work, several publications have garnered significant attention and acclaim within the field of neuroscience.

Her landmark paper, A cortical region consisting entirely of face-selective cells, published in Science (journal) in 2006, revealed the existence of specialized brain regions dedicated to processing faces. Tsao and her colleagues identified "face patches" in the brains of macaque monkeys, providing insights into the neural mechanisms underlying the facial recognition system. Functional compartmentalization and viewpoint generalization within the macaque face-processing system, published in Science (journal) in 2008, provides insights into the organization and function of the face-processing system in the macaque brain. Using functional magnetic resonance imaging (fMRI), they identify specialized regions in the inferior temporal cortex that respond strongly to faces. Within these regions, they discover functional compartmentalization, with different sub-regions specialized in processing specific facial features like identity or expression. Another notable contribution published in Nature Neuroscience in 2009 was her paper on Faces and objects in macaque cerebral cortex, where Tsao and her team further explored the organization of face-selective cells in the macaque cortex, shedding light on the distinction between processing faces and other objects.

These publications represent just a fraction of Tsao's extensive body of work, which has significantly advanced our understanding of the neural basis of visual perception and cognition.

Other popular publications:

- Mechanisms of face perception. Doris Y. Tsao; Margaret S. Livingstone. Annual Review of Neuroscience (2008).
- Comparing face patch systems in macaques and humans. Doris Y. Tsao; Sebastian Moeller; Winrich A. Freiwald. Proceedings of the National Academy of Sciences of the United States of America (2008).
- A face feature space in the macaque temporal lobe. Winrich A Freiwald; Doris Y Tsao; Margaret S Livingstone. Nature Neuroscience (2009).
- The Code for Facial Identity in the Primate Brain. Le Chang; Doris Y. Tsao; Doris Y. Tsao. Cell (2017).
- Patches with Links: A Unified System for Processing Faces in the Macaque Temporal Lobe. Sebastian Moeller; Winrich A. Freiwald; Doris Y. Tsao. Science (2008).
- Nanotools for Neuroscience and Brain Activity Mapping. A. Paul Alivisatos; Anne M. Andrews; Edward S. Boyden; Miyoung Chun. ACS Nano (2013).
- Stereopsis activates V3A and caudal intraparietal areas in macaques and humans. Doris Y. Tsao; Wim Vanduffel; Wim Vanduffel; Yuka Sasaki; Denis Fize. Neuron (2003).

== See also ==
- List of neuroscientists
- Margaret Livingstone
- Science (journal)
- MacArthur Fellows Program
