= Phillips Foster Greene =

American physician

- Born: May 30, 1892; Van, Turkey
- Died: April 11, 1967 (aged 74); New Richmond, Ohio
- Education: Amherst College Harvard Medical School
- Spouse: Ruth Altman Greene
- Children: Ellen Greene, Anne Greene Judy, Frederick D. Greene II, Margaret Greene Dickson
- Parent(s): Sarah Foster and Frederick Davis Greene

Phillips Foster Greene (May 30, 1892 – April 11, 1967) was an American doctor who, in collaboration with the Yale-China Association, pioneered medical missions to China from 1923 to 1943, and to Burma from 1951 to 1953. Greene was most known for his contribution to the Chinese health system through his leadership of the Hsiang-Ya Medical School, and as Director of the American Red Cross in China. In addition to evangelical motives, he focused especially on sustainability and collaboration with local groups, a concept not to be widely considered until decades later.

== Early life and education ==
Phillips Foster Greene was born to Sarah Foster and Rev. Frederick Davis Greene in 1892 in Van, Turkey. His parents were missionaries there under the American Board of Commissioners for Foreign Missions when Greene was born, but evacuated two years later due to violence toward Americans in Turkey. Rev. Greene became involved in fundraising for international relief through public addresses and publications, including as secretary of the National Armenian Relief Association. Phillips Greene's paternal grandparents were also well-known missionaries. Notably, Greene's grandfather, Joseph Kingsbury Greene, wrote Leavening the Levant in 1916. Phillips Greene and his three younger brothers, Joseph, Edward, and David, were raised in Upper Montclair, New Jersey, under significant Christian and missionary influence.

Greene attended Amherst College and received his B.A in 1915. He went on to study at Harvard Medical School, and earned a medical degree in 1919. While at Harvard he became a Student Volunteer for Foreign Missions, during which time he met Ruth Altman Greene, whom he would later marry.

== Career ==
=== Transition from Turkey ===
While living in Constantinople, Turkey on the commission of the American Board of Commissioners for Foreign Missions political unrest made medical work in Turkey impossible for Greene. Following the Allied Peace Terms of World War I, Turkish authorities aimed to minimize foreign influence; American doctors were no longer welcome. The hospital in Anatolia, to which Greene had been assigned, was closed. Greene and his wife lived in Turkey from 1921 to 1923.

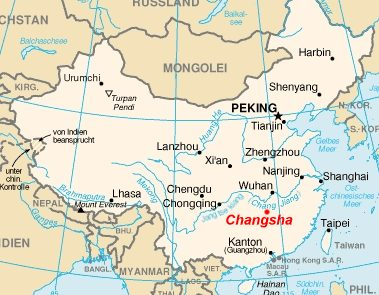
Location of Changsha, Hunan province, China

=== Work in China ===
Greene soon accepted a position as teaching Staff at Hsiang-Ya Medical School, Changsha, China in 1923, where he remained until 1927. In an early letter home, Greene described this assignment as an opportunity "to give good medical training with Christian character while the profession in China is still young," and added that "great things are at stake" in his work there. At this time local warlords, in the name of the conservative North or the revolutionary South, were battling for power in China, a new republic. Greene and his wife were caught in the crossfire of this struggle as they first arrived in the province of Hunan. The Greenes lived in the Yale-in-China campus, just north of Changsha.

In their first year of medical work at Hsiang-Ya, Greene noted the challenge in interacting with the local staff. He was also met with opposition from Changsha townspeople who thought the foreigner to be a bad omen, a possible cause of the flooding and the Cholera outbreak that were affecting their town. Due to a new policy of aiding only Chinese-administered programs, the Rockefeller Foundation withdrew funding from Greene's medical work, and the Hsiang-Ya hospital was closed for the summer of 1924.

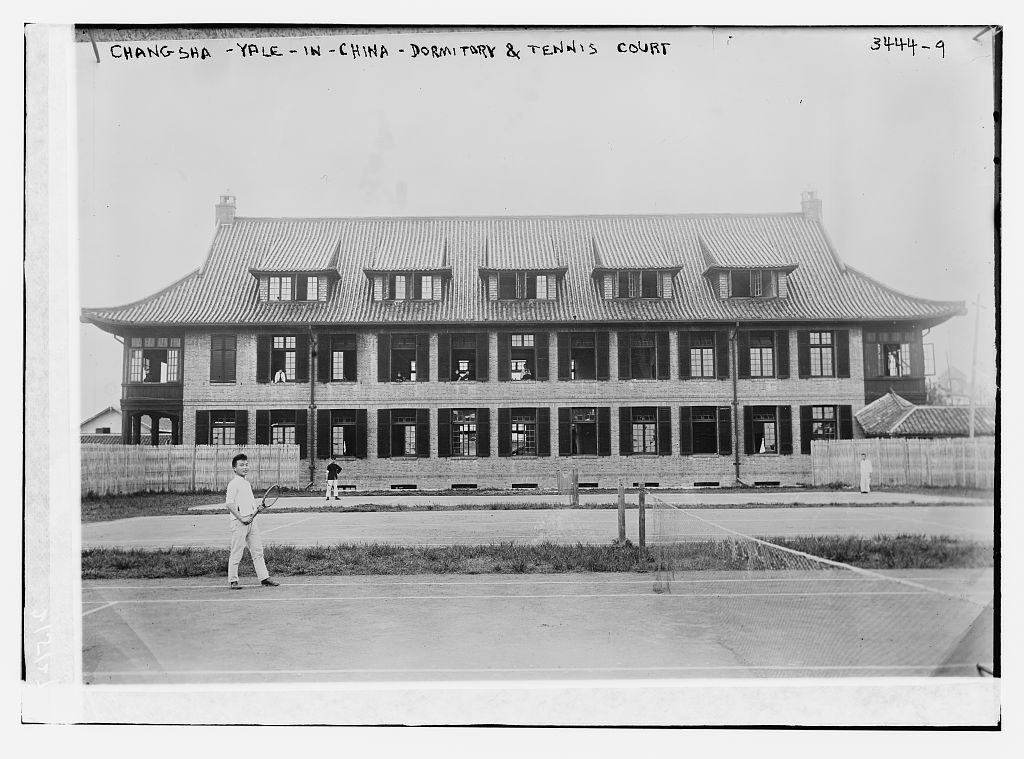
Changsha - Yale-in-China's Dormitory and tennis court

In fall 1924 the Hsiang-Ya Medical School and hospital re-opened. Greene and his colleagues pushed for an increased focus on collaboration with Chinese doctors. Further opposition to foreign influence by Chinese Nationalists and Communists caused Hsiang-Ya students to strike. This led Greene to further revise his staffing: he wrote, "The medical school will be reorganized with only such foreign personnel as are necessary for the efficient running of the hospital." Through their efforts, the Governing Board of the Medical School was eventually fully Chinese.

By the spring of 1925, anti-foreign and anti-religious sentiment had begun to cause fighting and rioting in Changsha and across China, and Greene relocated temporarily with his family to Guling (now Lushan, China) to study the Chinese language for the summer. At this time, many established missionaries to China were evacuating permanently, but Greene soon returned to work in the hospital despite threats to his life. In the fall of 1925, a northern province's drought and famine caused refugees to inundate Changsha and Greene's hospital, which was followed by an epidemic of Cholera.

1926 brought heightened conflict between China's regional warlords, and an influx of battle-wounded patients to the Hsiang-ya Hospital. The Rockefeller Foundation renewed grants for Greene's work, including additions to the hospital and medical school. However, many Hsiang-Ya staff evacuated due to the threat of violence from a southern army. Greene remained and took on the brunt of the medical work. When the Southern army reached Changsha, Greene began to interact with Nationalist leadership in a medical capacity, as well as with other key figures.

When Communism gained currency in Changsha in the fall of 1926, servants and nurses went on strike, leaving the Hsiang-Ya hospital with few staff. Despite the imprisonment of many fellow doctors and the closing of other schools by the growing Communist regime, Greene kept the Hsiang-Ya campus running. His wife noted: "... we were the only school, private of government, general or technical, in the whole city that was still in operation." However, Greene too was eventually asked to evacuate in January 1927, when Americans were ordered out of China by the U.S. Government.

=== Work in the United States ===
In 1927 Greene and his family fled China due to the Chinese Civil War, remaining in the United States until 1931. During this time, Greene worked as the assistant professor of surgery at University of Wisconsin Medical School. Changsha's violent takeover by the Communist bands of Jiangxi delayed the Greenes' return to Hsiang-Ya until fall 1931.

=== Return to China ===
Greene worked in China from 1931-1941 as Head of the Department of Surgery and Dean of Hsiang-Ya Medical school, and then from 1941-43 as Director of the American Red Cross in China.

Greene arrived in Shanghai at the time of the Manchurian Incident, when the Sino-Japanese War began, and he treated refugees of natural disaster and war alike while re-staffing the medical school and hospital. He met with leaders of public health, including the Chinese National Board of Health (now the Ministry of Health), to cement standardized government requirements for medical curricula. In 1933 Greene was commissioned for major responsibility in the Chinese government's public health program in Guling. He was also responsible for organizing 30,000 aid kits as the Chinese armies moved against Japan.

Later that year, Greene secured the aid of the League of Nations Advisor to China on Public Health in developing Hsiang-Ya's public health program, among the first in the nation. Coordinating with the Chinese government, Greene also saw Hsiang-Ya's public health program expand to regions beyond Changsha, using the buildings of closed mission hospitals as dispensaries for education and treatment.

In 1936 Greene was granted a one-year furlough, followed by a re-appointment in Changsha by the Yale-in-China Association. Phillips and Ruth Greene spent this year raising American awareness of the social, political, and religious climate of China. The Greenes returned to Changsha at the height of the Sino-Japanese War. The family barely avoided being in Shanghai when it was bombed by the Japanese on August 12, 1937. Once Greene arrived in Changsha, bombing victims were sent to him for treatment from Liling and other cities on the battle front.

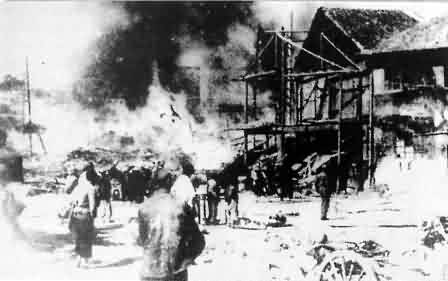
1938 Changsha Fire

On November 24, 1937, Japanese forces bombed Changsha. The city was now on the fighting front of the war. Despite the American consul's pressure to evacuate, Greene remained to treat wounds of civilians. As military personnel and refugees from Japanese-controlled cities inundated Changsha, Greene opened new dispensaries and clinics. By December, both Yale-in-China and authorities in Changsha were urging all foreign families out of China, must urgently the women and children. Ruth and the children took refuge in Manila, The Philippines, while Greene remained in the war zone. A first-hand account of conditions in January 1937 is given by Greene's first cousin, Lois Greene MD, an ear, nose, and throat specialist, in the "Inside China" column of The Stanford Daily. In February 1938, bombings of Changsha escalated. Greene sent most nursing and medical students away to Guiyang, and kept the most advanced students to keep the hospital in operation. By November 1938, Greene was the sole remaining doctor in Changsha. During the 1938 Changsha Fire, Greene and his colleagues were able to keep the militants from burning down the hospital as well. Greene stayed in Changsha to treat burn victims. He was then responsible for the transport of medical supplies to the Chinese interior. Despite his train being bombed, Greene successfully brought medicine from Shanghai to Changsha and continued to treat outbreaks of disease there.

Again in January 1940, Greene took the risk of transporting 2 tons of medical supplies past the Japanese front to Changsha and Guiyang, where the Hsiang-Ya medical school had been relocated. While working in Guiyang, the Central Hospital where Greene was working was bombed. He returned to Changsha to re-establish Hsiang-Ya in June 1940. In view of the worsening political situation, the American Consul in Kunming requested Greene's return to America. Greene refused and remained in Changsha. In November 1940 Greene received on official Certificate of Merit for service in medical education from the National Bureau of Education in Chongqing.

In 1941 Greene was appointed Director of the American Red Cross in Chongqing. He was responsible for the intake of all forms of civilian aid by truck over the Burma Road, and by airlift over the Himalayas. This position entailed the acceptance of supplies into Chongqing, and their distribution to both Nationalist and Communist groups. He then returned to the United States in 1943.

=== Return to the U.S. ===
In 1944, Greene served as associate dean and clinical professor of surgery at Long Island College of Medicine. He had planned to teach war surgery there for six months before returning to China, but ended up staying at the College until 1951.

=== Work in Burma ===
In 1951, Phillips Greene accepted a position as staff member in the Rangoon, Burma General Hospital and Medical School, where he remained until 1958.

== Late life ==
In 1958, Phillips Greene returned to the United States to practice medicine there until his death. Greene died on April 11, 1967, in New Richmond, Ohio.

== Legacy ==
The letters of Phillips Greene are recorded by his wife Ruth in Hsiang-Ya Journal, an account of Greene's work in China.

=== Hsiang-Ya Hospital ===
The Hsiang-Ya Hospital and Medical school is now the Hunan Medical School of the People's Republic of China. Greene's preservation of the Hsiang-Ya hospital not only allowed the hospital to continue despite eventual Japanese occupation and subsequent Communist takeover, but also allowed the Yale-China Association to continue, eventually returning to Changsha.
