= Association of Black Cardiologists =

American non-profit health organization

- Abbreviation: ABC
- Formation: 18 November 1974; 51 years ago
- Founder: Richard Allen Williams
- Founded at: Dallas, Texas
- Legal status: Non-profit
- Location: Washington, D.C.
- Region served: United States
- Members: 1,800
- President: Michelle Albert
- Website: abcardio.org

The Association of Black Cardiologists (ABC) is an organization founded to bring special attention to the adverse impact of cardiovascular disease on African Americans.

== History ==
The ABC was founded in 1974 by Richard Allen Williams, in association with Boisey O. Barnes, Paul Terry Batties, Walter M. Booker, Kermit L. Brown, Charles L. Curry, Major Geer, Richard F. Gillum, L. Julian Haywood, Hannibal E. Howell, Paul M. Jackson, Edith Irby Jones, Alphonso Jordan, Huerta C. Neals, Levi V. Perry, Felipe Robinson, Daniel D. Savage, and Elijah Saunders, at the American Heart Association conference. The decision to create the organization was spontaneous and happened over a dinner meeting convened to discuss the cardiovascular problems faced by African Americans.

After speaking with Williams, the American Heart Association assigned Glen Bennett to be executive director for the ABC and paid his salary in this role. Williams served as the association's president for ten years.

== Work on health inequalities ==
According to research, fewer than 3% of cardiologists were African American as of 2015, yet it is important for patients to be able to identify with their doctors to build trust.

In 2007, the ABC were invited to contribute to a Scientific American issue on controversies around race-based medicine.

In 2019, a paper was published describing the creation of the ABC Cardiovascular Implementation Study (CVIS) which sought to facilitate robust participation of African Americans, other minorities and underserved populations in clinical trials. At around the same time, a study was conducted on the potential use of ABC membership to recruit investigators who could lead clinical research to increase the enrollment of black patients.

In 2020, the ABC shared resources on COVID-19's impact on black communities in response to the higher death rates seen in African Americans. The ABC response to the Black Lives Matter campaign was highlighted by the Physician-Patient Alliance for Health and Safety as an example of the need for systemic change to address healthcare inequalities.
