= Richard Allen Williams =

American physician (born 1936)

- Born: 1936 (age 89–90); Wilmington, Delaware, U.S.
- Education: Howard High School of Technology; Harvard University; State University of New York
- Scientific career
- Workplaces: Brigham and Women's Hospital; Harvard Medical School; Martin Luther King Jr. Community Hospital; David Geffen School of Medicine at UCLA

Richard Allen Williams (born 1936) is an American physician who is founder of the Association of Black Cardiologists. He previously served as the President of the National Medical Association.

== Early life and education ==
Williams was born in Wilmington, Delaware, to a family of eight children. He was educated in a segregated community, and attended an all-Black school until 12th grade. He attended Howard High School of Technology, where he graduated top of his class. Williams was awarded a full scholarship to attend Harvard University, which he graduated cum laude. He was the first African American from Delaware to join Harvard, and the first cohort of students to live in segregated dormitories. He studied medicine at the State University of New York and graduated in 1962. He completed a cardiology fellowship at Brigham and Women's Hospital and the Keck School of Medicine of USC. From his teen years, Williams has been an accomplished jazz trumpeter.

== Research and career ==
Williams joined the Harvard Medical School as an instructor in cardiology. While there, he established a Central Recruitment Council for hospitals in Boston. The council increased the representation of Black medical trainees at Harvard University, Boston University and Tufts University. The council worked to have Peter Bent Brigham Hospital accept its first Black trainee to complete an internship at this precursor of the current Brigham and Women's Hospital. Williams moved to California, where he helped to open the Martin Luther King Jr. Community Hospital in 1972. He worked with David Satcher to establish the King-Drew Sickle Cell Center, and was appointed the Director. Williams moved to West Los Angeles VA Medical Center, where he was made Chief of the Heart Station. He was the first Black physician to become Professor at the David Geffen School of Medicine at UCLA.

In 1974, Williams founded the Association of Black Cardiologists (ABC), and served as President for ten years. The ABC established the Richard Allen Williams Scholarship in 1980, which provides financial support to Black medical students. In an essay for the Harvard Medical School alumni association, Williams remarked that he established the ABC because "Blacks were being misunderstood by whites in medicine". ABC looks to eliminate disparities in cardiovascular disease through advocacy and education, and started a patient-focussed platform that offers free digital health guides. He also launched the Minority Health Institute, which looks to take on racism in healthcare and improve the health of minorities.

== Awards and honors ==
- 2001: American Heart Association Louis B. Russell Jr. Memorial Award
- 2004: Harvard Medical School Lifetime Achievement Award
- 2009: National Minority Quality Forum Achievement Award
- 2017: Elected President of the National Medical Association
- 2018: American College of Cardiology Pioneering African American Physician
- 2018: UCLA Black Alumni Association Jackie Robinson Award
- 2019: American Medical Association Testimonial Dinner
- 2019: American College of Cardiology Distinguished Award for Leadership in Diversity and Inclusion
- 2020: Harris County Medical Society John T. McGovern Compleat Physician Award

== Selected works ==
- Williams, Richard Allen, 1936- (2020). Blacks in medicine clinical, demographic, and socioeconomic correlations. Springer. ISBN 978-3-030-41960-8. OCLC 1153038118.
- Williams, Richard Allen. (2014). Healthcare disparities at the crossroads with healthcare reform. Springer. ISBN 978-1-4899-8786-0. OCLC 902763811.
- Textbook of Black-related diseases. Williams, Richard Allen, 1936-. New York: McGraw-Hill. 1975. ISBN 0-07-070560-7. OCLC 1288411.
