= James Mahoney (pulmonologist) =

American pulmonologist and internist (died 2020)

- Born: c. 1957
- Died: April 27, 2020 (aged 62); New York City, US
- Education: LIU Post (BS); SUNY Downstate College of Medicine (MD)
- Occupations: Pulmonologist, internist
- Medical career
- Institutions: University Hospital of Brooklyn; SUNY Downstate Medical Center; Kings County Hospital Center
- Sub-specialties: Pulmonary diseases

James A. "Charlie" Mahoney (1957/1958 – April 27, 2020) was an American pulmonologist and internist. He was the head of the intensive care unit and a clinical assistant professor of medicine at the SUNY Downstate Medical Center.

== Early life and education ==
James A. Mahoney was born in either 1957 or 1958 to Leila and Oscar Mahoney. His father was a member of the United States Air Force. Mahoney was raised in military housing in Bermuda and the South Shore in Nassau County, New York. He had four siblings. As a child, a family friend nicknamed him Charlie. He began working with his older brother at the age of eight. They worked at a laundromat, German delicatessen, and a lunch counter. Mahoney was the captain of the football team at Roosevelt High School.

Mahoney completed a B.S. at C.W. Post in 1981 while working in patient transport at the Long Beach Medical Center. In 1986, he earned an M.D. at SUNY Downstate College of Medicine. He completed a residency in internal medicine at his alma mater and served as chief resident from 1989 to 1990. He completed a pulmonary and critical care fellowship in 1993.

== Career ==
Mahoney began working at the University Hospital of Brooklyn and Kings County Hospital Center in 1982. In 1993, He became a clinical assistant professor of medicine and head of the intensive care unit at the SUNY Downstate College of Medicine.

His clinical interests included pulmonary diseases including sarcoidosis, pulmonary hypertension, asthma, chronic obstructive pulmonary disease, and bronchoscopy.

The COVID-19 pandemic in New York changed Mahoney's plan to retire in January 2020. He treated COVID-19 patients at Downstate and the Kings County Hospital Center. His workplace did not provide sufficient personal protective equipment.

== Personal life ==
During his graduate studies, Mahoney met Lisa Johnson, a graphic designer, while he was traveling through California. They married in 1987 and had three children. The family resided in Baldwin where Mahoney served as a football and baseball coach. The Mahoneys divorced in 2004.

Mahoney resided in Freeport, New York. He was in a long-term relationship with Dawn Havens at the time of his death. Mahoney died from COVID-19 during the COVID-19 pandemic in New York (state) on April 27, 2020, at the NYU Langone Medical Center.
