= Sleights of Mind =

2010 book by Stephen Macknik, Susana Martínez-Conde, and Sandra Blakeslee

Sleights of Mind: What the Neuroscience of Magic Reveals about Our Everyday Deceptions
- First edition
- Author: Stephen Macknik, Susana Martinez-Conde and Sandra Blakeslee
- Subject: Neuroscience, Magic, Neuromagic
- Genre: Non-fiction
- Publisher: Henry Holt and Co.
- Publication date: November 9, 2010
- Pages: 291 pp.
- ISBN: 978-0312611675

Sleights of Mind: What the Neuroscience of Magic Reveals about Our Everyday Deceptions is a 2010 popular science book, written by neuroscientists Stephen Macknik and Susana Martinez-Conde, with science writer Sandra Blakeslee. Working alongside several magicians, Macknik and Martinez-Conde studied how conjuring techniques trick the brain. Sleights of Mind considers the greater implications of magic and misdirection for clinical conditions such as autism, and for everyday life situations, including choice and trust in personal and business relationships.

Sleights of Mind introduces Neuromagic as a new area of scientific endeavor, a discipline aimed to uncover the interaction between brain science and the art of magic. Macknik and Martinez-Conde propose that understanding how the mind perceives magic and illusion will provide a greater understanding of perception and cognition at large.

== Synopsis ==
Macknik and Martinez-Conde state that magic tricks deceive people because humans have hardwired processes of attention and awareness that can be exploited. Magicians use inherent mental and neural limitations by leading audiences to perceive and feel what they are neurologically inclined to. Working with magicians such as Apollo Robbins, Teller, Mac King, and James Randi, Macknik and Martinez-Conde research the ways in which the perceptual and cognitive elements of magic relate to more than deceits. The authors reveal the neural underpinnings of the magical methods that explain how our brains perceive magic.

Through their exploration, Macknik and Martinez-Conde uncover how our brains work in everyday situations. They describe how if you have ever bought an expensive item you had sworn you would never buy, the salesperson was creating the "illusion of choice", a core technique of magic. They also relate the use of magic to Bernie Madoff's "illusion of trust". Through these examples, Sleights of Mind illuminates the reasons for studying magic, and its implications for research on, and renewed understanding of, perceptual and cognitive processes.

== Awards ==
Evening Standard Best Book of the Year List

Prisma Prize

== Critical reception ==
The book has been reviewed by authors of other science-related books, including Neil deGrasse Tyson, Dan Ariely and J. J. Abrams. It has also been reviewed in the New York Times and The Wall Street Journal.
