= Frank Moya =

American physician

Dr. Frank Moya MD
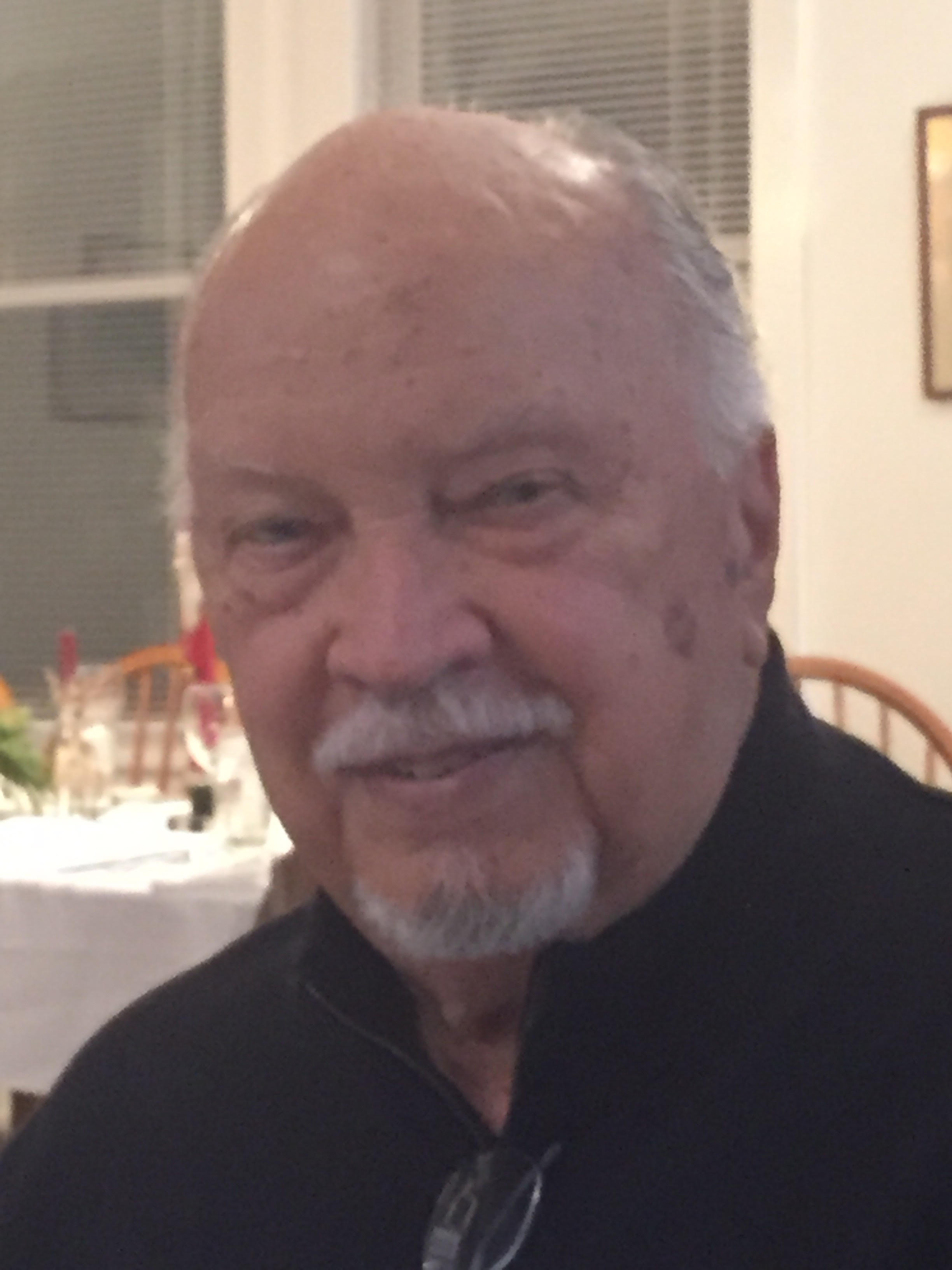
- Frank Moya (2016)
- Born: January 20, 1929; New York, New York
- Died: August 30, 2021 (aged 92); Miami, Florida
- Occupation: Anesthesiologist

Frank Moya (January 20, 1929 – August 30, 2021) was an American anesthesiologist, businessman, and educator. He was widely recognized for his research in obstetric anesthesia and newborn physiology, and joined the University of Miami School of Medicine's Department of Anesthesiology as the youngest department chairman in the country, at the age of 33. Moya also held several prestigious national and state Anesthesiology positions and founded the Frank Moya Continuing Education Programs.

== Early life ==
Frank Moya was born in 1929, in New York City to poor immigrant Puerto Rican parents in a small hospital just outside of Harlem. Growing up in and around Harlem in the Great Depression, Moya spoke Spanish exclusively in his first five years of life. Moya showed great precocity from a very early age, re-selling surplus newspapers and becoming chief on his local 116th Street Puerto Rican Street gang (at 6 or 7 years old) before leaving Harlem with his family at age 9 to move to the Bronx. Moving to the South Bronx allowed Moya to meet his first great loves: reading and the New York City Public Library librarian who introduced him to books, Mrs. Anderson. Moya credits her with sparking his love of reading and so changing the course of his life.

While Moya initially planned to become a civil engineer, a fateful accident when he was twelve inspired him to change his course in life. Frank Moya and his brother Robert were throwing knives at a target when a stray blade pierced Robert's leg. Moya quickly took control of the situation, dressing the wound, and saving his brother's life. The excitement of the experience inspired Moya's interest in medicine.

== Education ==
Despite his impoverished background, Moya pursued pre-medical studies at the New York University at Washington Square at the young age of 16 while still living in the Bronx. After his graduation in 1949, Moya was admitted to the Long Island College of Medicine (now the Downstate Medical Center) in 1949 when he was only 19 years old. He excelled in medical school and made the Dean's list every year he attended, made the National Honor Society in his third year, and graduated as one of the top three students in his class.

After graduating from medical school, Moya entered the U.S. Navy for his internship and subsequent residency, completing three years of clinical training at the U.S. Naval Hospital (St. Alban's) in Great Lakes, Illinois. When asked why Moya chose the Navy over the many other available programs, Moya's reasoning was pragmatic: “The reason was very simple—money. I needed money. In those days hospitals were paying $50 a month for interns, but the navy was paying $5,000 per year for an intern.” Moya excelled in his internship, and chose to stay on at St. Albans as a resident to meld his twin loves of anesthesia and obstetrics.

== Medical career ==
After finishing his residency, Moya became the Chief of Anesthesiology at Great Lakes Naval Hospital. At the time, he held the rank of Lieutenant Commander. After Moya received the highest mark on the written examination of the American Board of Anesthesiology, Moya was invited to do an obstetric anesthesia fellowship at Columbia Presbyterian Hospital. However, Moya ultimately entered Columbia Presbyterian Hospital not as a fellow but as a permanent faculty instead—demand for Moya's talent was so high that Columbia's Head of Anesthesia at the time wanted to ensure that Moya was with Columbia Presbyterian instead of a lesser hospital. So in 1958, Moya joined the teaching faculty of Columbia University Presbyterian Hospital, where he was mentored by Dr. Virginia Apgar in anesthesia and obstetric research and by Dr. John Bonica (the former professional wrestler) in the politics of academic medicine. When Dr. Apgar left Columbia, Moya took her place as Chief of Obstetric Anesthesia.

In 1962, Moya was appointed the chairman of the University of Miami's anesthesia department, becoming the youngest department chairman in the nation at the age of 33. However, Moya's meteoric rise continued—five years later, he became the university's Associate Dean for Hospital Affairs, and the following year he was appointed the acting dean of the university's school of medicine. In the course of Moya's ten years at the University of Miami, he served as the president of the three most prestigious national anesthesiology associations: the American Society of Anesthesiologists (ASA) from 1974 to 1975, the Association of University Anesthesiologists (AUA) from 1972 to 1973, and the Society of Academic Anesthesia Chairs (SAAC) from 1969 to 1970. Over the course of his career, Moya published over 250 scientific articles, abstracts, and textbooks. In 1970, Moya shifted to private practice and became Chairman of the Department of Anesthesiology at Mount Sinai Medical Center in Miami Beach, a position he held for 27 years before retiring.

== Medical Malpractice Insurance ==
In addition to his medical achievements, Moya is an accomplished businessman. In 1984, he founded the first successful medical malpractice insurance company for anesthesiologists, the Anesthesiologists Professional Assurance Company (APAC). Before Moya, medical malpractice insurance for anesthesiologist was either completely unobtainable or (later on) completely unaffordable, with premiums of as much as $125,000 per year per doctor in 1984. By organizing APAC in the Cayman Islands as a re-insurance company as a way to share the risk of insuring anesthesiologists, Moya made malpractice insurance achievable for the common anesthesiologist. APAC was later acquired by FPIC Insurance Group, Inc.

== Continuing Education Programs ==
In 1964, Moya founded the continuing medical education programs, Current Reviews in Clinical Anesthesia, for anesthesiologists, Current Reviews for Nurse Anesthetists, and 3 annual anesthesia seminars, all of which are still ongoing today. He also funded the establishment of the first school for nurse anesthetists in the State of Florida, at Barry University.
