= Eli Friedman =

American physician (born 1933)

Eli A. Friedman (born on April 9, 1933) is an American nephrologist and academic. While overseeing the Division of Nephrology at the State University of New York Downstate Medical Center, he invented the first portable hemodialysis machine. Died October 7th 2026 in Brooklyn NY.

== Early life ==
Friedman was born in Brooklyn, New York on April 9, 1933. He.attended New Utrecht High School, Brooklyn College, and the State University of New York Downstate Medical Center where he received an M.D. degree in 1957. He served as intern, nephrology fellow, and senior medical resident at Harvard Medical School's Peter Bent Brigham Hospital from 1957 to 1961.

== Career ==
He was an epidemic intelligence officer for the United States Public Health Service's Communicable Disease Center, from 1961 to 1963. In 1963, Friedman returned to SUNY Downstate in Brooklyn, New York, where he is currently a distinguished teaching professor of medicine. Dr. Friedman was chief of the Division of Nephrology in SUNY Downstate's Department of Medicine until 2009.

In 1973, Friendman invented the portable hemodialysis machine (Suitcase Kidney). It was scaled to fit a metal attache case that permits dialysis patients to be mobile performing their hemodialysis off site in hotel rooms or on ships. By being able to dialyze themselves, patients gained a large degree of freedom from large, centralized treatment centers enhancing their life quality. Exceptionally high liability insurance rates restricted the broad utilization of the device which still is limited in application.

Following his wife's death, Friedman's research focused on kidney failure. Friedman has performed clinical studies in the course of diabetes and high blood pressure. His work has been recognized by the American College of Physicians which conferred the distinction of terming him a "Master." He received two honorary degrees (University of Madras, India and Long Island University, New York) and has been made a Fellow of the Royal College of Physicians in the United Kingdom.

Having edited nine books and published over 520 peer reviewed papers, Friedman is a recognized authority in nephrology, serving as president of several scientific societies, including the American and International Societies for Artificial Organs and The International Society for Geriatric Nephrology and Urology. Friedman has been consistently listed as a "Best Doctor" in New York and the National and International Who's Who. Both the International Society for Hemodialysis and the Alumni Association of Downstate Medical Center awarded Lifetime Achievement Awards to Friedman who celebrated his 79th Birthday in 2011.

== Personal life ==
In 1957, Friedman married Mildred Barrett-Lennard with whom he fathered three daughters: Amy Louise, Rebecca Alica, and Sara Jo. Mildred died in 1997.
