= Susana Martinez-Conde =

Spanish-American neuroscientist and writer (born 1969)

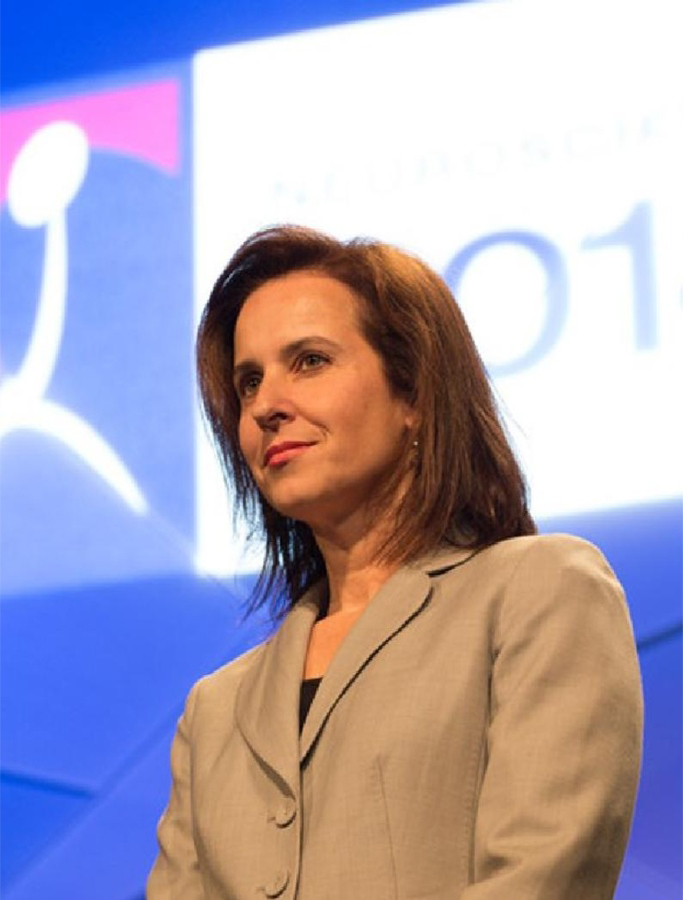
- Susana Martinez-Conde receiving the Science Educator Award from the Society for Neuroscience, 2014. Credit: Joe Shymanski, Society for Neuroscience
- Born: Susana Martinez-Conde; October 1, 1969 (age 56); A Coruña, Spain
- Education: Universidad Complutense de Madrid, Universidade de Santiago de Compostela, Harvard University
- Known for: Illusions, art and visual perception, attention and awareness, Books: Sleights of Mind
- Awards: Science Educator of the Year - Society for Neuroscience
- Scientific career
- Fields: Neuroscience, Science Writing
- Workplaces: Harvard Medical School, University College London, Barrow Neurological Institute, State University of New York

Susana Martinez-Conde (born October 1, 1969) is a Spanish-American neuroscientist and science writer. She is a professor of ophthalmology, neurology, physiology, and pharmacology at the SUNY Downstate Medical Center, where she directs the Laboratory of Integrative Neuroscience. She directed laboratories previously at the Barrow Neurological Institute and University College London. Her research bridges perceptual, cognitive, and oculomotor neuroscience. She is best known for her studies on illusions, eye movements and perception, neurological disorders, and attentional misdirection in stage magic.

== Early life and education ==
Susana Martinez-Conde was born in 1969 in A Coruña, Spain, to a merchant sailor father from Santander, Spain and a stay-at-home mother from Garciaz. Her maternal grandfather survived the sinking of the SS Castillo de Olite in 1939, during the Spanish Civil War.

She majored in experimental psychology at the Universidad Complutense de Madrid in 1992, and obtained her PhD in medicine and surgery from the neuroscience program at the Universidade de Santiago de Compostela in 1996. She received her postdoctoral training from the Nobel Laureate David Hubel at Harvard Medical School,

== Career ==
She became an instructor in neurobiology at Harvard Medical School in 2001. She then became lecturer in ophthalmology and laboratory director at University College London. In 2004, she returned to the United States as an assistant professor, and later, associate professor, at the Barrow Neurological Institute in Phoenix, Arizona, where she directed the Laboratory of Visual Neuroscience. In 2014, she moved to Brooklyn, New York, as professor of ophthalmology, neurology, physiology, and pharmacology at SUNY Downstate Medical Center, where she directs the Laboratory of Integrative Neuroscience.

== Research ==
Much of Martinez-Conde's research focuses on how our brains create perceptual and cognitive illusions in everyday life. She has studied the Rotating Snakes illusion, Isia Leviant's Enigma illusion, Victor Vasarely's Nested Squares illusion, Troxler fading and other types of perceptual fading illusions, and various perceptual and attentional illusions in stage magic. Martinez-Conde created the Best Illusion of the Year Contest in 2005, and writes the Illusions column for Scientific American Mind.

Martinez-Conde studies the effects of attention on visual perception, and the neural bases of attention and visual awareness. Her research on visual awareness has concentrated on the neural bases of perceptual fading, visual masking, and attentional misdirection in stage magic. Martinez-Conde has pioneered the study of stage magic techniques from a neuroscience perspective. She has proposed that neuroscientists and magicians share many overlapping interests, and that both disciplines should collaborate with one another to mutual advantage.

Martinez-Conde has researched the connection between art and visual science, as well as the mechanisms underlying the perception of art. She has studied the neural bases of kinetic illusions in Op art, and discovered novel visual illusions based on the artworks of Victor Vasarely.

Martinez-Conde has researched the interactions between eye movements, vision and perception, both in the healthy brain and in neural disease. She investigates how small, involuntary eye movements called microsaccades affect perception and visual processing. She also studies how neurological disease affects eye movements in order to gain a better comprehension of the disorders and aid their differential and early diagnosis.

== Bibliography ==
In addition to being a regular contributor to Scientific American, Martinez-Conde has co-authored two books:

- Macknik, Stephen L.; Martinez-Conde, Susana; Blakeslee, Sandra (2011). Sleights of Mind: What the Neuroscience of Magic Reveals About Our Everyday Deceptions (1st Picador ed.). New York: Picador. ISBN 978-0312611675. It is also available in Spanish and Chinese translations.
- Martinez-Conde, Susana; Macknik, Stephen L. (2017). Champions of Illusion: The Science Behind Mind-Boggling Images and Mystifying Brain Puzzles. Scientific American - Farrar, Straus and Giroux.

gallery

Sleights of Mind has been called "a very cool read" by J. J. Abrams. It was listed as one of the 36 Best Books of the year by The Evening Standard, London, and received the Prisma Prize to the Best Science Book of the year.

Martinez-Conde's research has also been featured in print in The New York Times, The New Yorker, The Wall Street Journal, The Atlantic, Wired, The LA Chronicle, The Times (London), The Chicago Tribune, The Boston Globe, Der Spiegel, etc., and in radio and TV shows, including Discovery Channel's Head Games and Daily Planet shows, NOVA: scienceNow, CBS Sunday Morning, NPR's Science Friday, and PRI's The World.

== Gallery ==
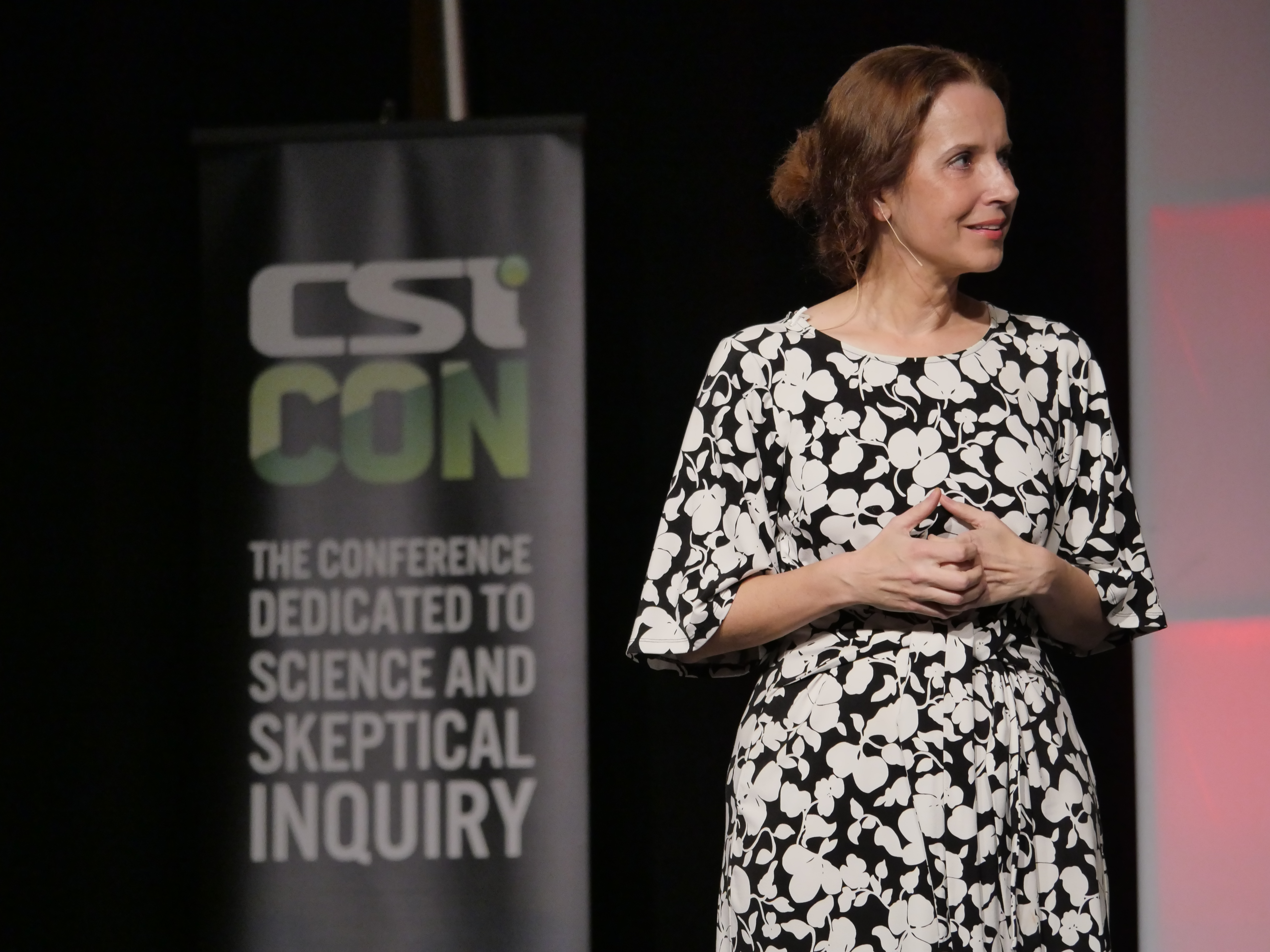
Susan Martinez-Conde CSICon 2018 Champions of Illusion

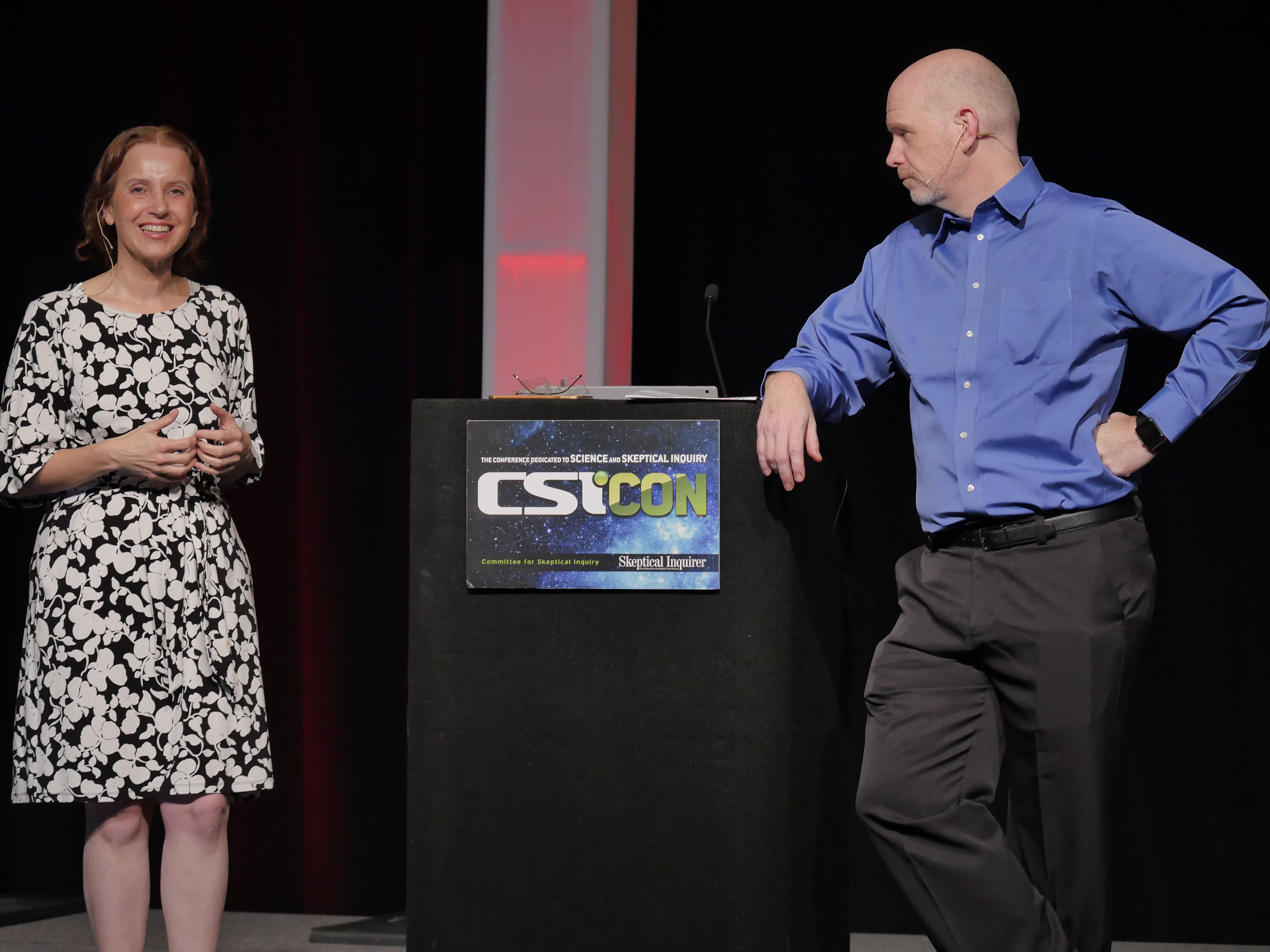
At CSICon 2018
