= Neuronal tuning =

Proposed ability of brain cells to represent different types of information

In neuroscience, neuronal tuning refers to the hypothesized property of brain cells by which they selectively represent a particular type of sensory, association, motor, or cognitive information. Some neuronal responses have been hypothesized to be optimally tuned to specific patterns through experience. Neuronal tuning can be strong and sharp, as observed in primary visual cortex (area V1), or weak and broad, as observed in neural ensembles. Single neurons are hypothesized to be simultaneously tuned to several modalities, such as visual, auditory, and olfactory. Neurons hypothesized to be tuned to different signals are often hypothesized to integrate information from the different sources. In computational models called neural networks, such integration is the major principle of operation. The best examples of neuronal tuning can be seen in the visual, auditory, olfactory, somatosensory, and memory systems, although due to the small number of stimuli tested the generality of neuronal tuning claims is still an open question.

== Visually Tuned System ==
Accepted neuronal tuning models suggest that neurons respond to different degrees based on the similarity between the optimal stimulus of the neuron and the given stimulus. (Teller (1984), however, has challenged the "detector" view of neurons on logical grounds) The first major evidence of neuronal tuning in the visual system was provided by Hubel and Wiesel in 1959. They discovered that oriented slits of light were the most effective (of a very small set tested) stimuli for striate cortex “simple cell” neurons. Other neurons, “complex cells," responded best to lines of a certain orientation moving in a specific direction. Overall, the V1 neurons were found to be selectively tuned to certain orientations, sizes, positions, and forms. Hubel and Wiesel won the Nobel Prize in Physiology or Medicine in 1981 for their discoveries concerning information processing in the visual system. (More recently, Carandini et al (2005) have pointed out that the distinction between "simple" and "complex" cells may not be a valid one, observing that "simple and complex cells may not form a dichotomy at all.")

While these simple cells in V1 respond to oriented bars through small receptive fields, the optimal visual stimulus becomes increasing complex as one moves toward the anterior of the brain. Neurons in area V4 are selectively tuned to different wavelengths, hues, and saturations of color. The middle temporal or area V5 is specifically tuned to the speed and direction of moving stimuli. At the apex of the ventral stream called the inferotemporal cortex, neurons became tuned to complex stimuli, such as faces. The specific tuning of intermediate neurons in the ventral stream is less clear, because the range of form variety that can be utilized for probing is nearly infinite.

In the anterior part of the ventral stream, various regions appear to be tuned selectively to identify body parts (extrastriate body area), faces (fusiform face area) (according to a recent paper by Adamson and Troiani (2018) regions of the fusiform face area respond equally to "food"), moving bodies (posterior superior temporal sulcus), or even scenes (parahippocampal place area). Neuronal tuning in these areas requires fine discrimination among complex patterns in each relevant category for object recognition. Recent findings suggest that this fine discrimination is a function of expertise and the individual level of categorization with stimuli. Specifically, work has been done by Gauthier et al (2001) to show fusiform face area (FFA) activation for birds in bird experts and cars in car experts when compared to the opposing stimuli. Gauthier et al (2002) also utilized a new class of objects called Greebles and trained people to recognize them at individual levels. After training, the FFA was tuned to distinguish between this class of objects as well as faces. Curran et al (2002) similarly trained people in a less structured class of objects called "blobs" and showed FFA selective activation for them. Overall, neurons can be tuned selectively discriminate between certain sets of stimuli that are experienced regularly in the world.

== Tuning in Other Systems ==
Neurons in other systems also become selectively tuned to stimuli. In the auditory system, different neurons may respond selectively to the frequency (pitch), amplitude (loudness), and/or complexity (uniqueness) of sounds. In the olfactory system, neurons may be tuned to certain kinds of smells. In the gustatory system, different neurons may respond selectively to different components of food: sweet, sour, salty, and bitter. In the somatosensory system, neurons may be selectively tuned to different types of pressure, temperature, bodily position, and pain. This tuning in the somatosensory system also provides feedback to the motor system so that it may selectively tune neurons to respond in specific ways to given stimuli. Finally, the encoding and storage of information in both short-term and long-term memory requires the tuning of neurons in complex ways such that information may be later retrieved.
