= Chinfei Chen =

Neuroscientist

Chinfei Chen is an American neuroscientist and member of the American Academy of Arts and Sciences studying synaptic plasticity. She is a professor of neurology and neurobiology at Harvard Medical School and the Associate Director of the Harvard Program in Neuroscience. She also works as a research associate in neurology at the Boston Children's Hospital.

== Early life ==
Chinfei Chen, born in the United States to Taiwanese immigrants, spent her early years in Wilmington, Delaware. Her father had previously moved to the United States to pursue a graduate degree in architecture. As Chen grew older, she and her family relocated to New York City, where she received her education through the city's public school system.

== Education and Training ==
While in New York, Chen went to Stuyvesant High School. She attended the University of Pennsylvania to pursue a Bachelor of Applied Science in engineering. During her undergraduate years, she joined Britton Chance's laboratory, where she studied brain activity by monitoring flavoprotein fluorescence. Chen later obtained her M.D. and Ph.D. from Harvard Medical School. While in graduate school, she first worked with Edward Kravitz to research neurotransmitter signaling pathways in lobsters. She then worked with Peter Hess on calcium channel biophysics for her Ph.D. Chen then completed her residency in adult neurology at Massachusetts General Hospital, followed by postdoctoral training with Wade Regehr at Harvard Medical School. Chen decided to study the thalamus during her postdoctoral training, after seeing a patient with damage to the mediodorsal thalamus during her residency.

== Research ==
Chen's research focuses on mechanisms of synaptic and circuit plasticity in the mammalian central nervous system, for which she was recognized by the American Academy of Arts and Sciences. Chen's research uncovered the functional organization of retinal inputs into the visual thalamus and insight into synaptic function of visual pathways in mouse model of autism and Rett syndrome. Building on her postdoctoral work in the Regehr lab, her own lab has characterized the normal developmental changes in the retinogeniculate synapse, and examined the activity- and experience-dependent mechanisms governing its anatomical and functional reorganization. This work was important, because it showed that plasticity in sensory systems, long thought to be mainly instantiated by changes in cortical circuits during limited developmental windows because of the Nobel Prize-winning work of David H. Hubel and Torsten Wiesel, could also occur in subcortical regions.

== Selected publications ==
- Hooks, BM; Chen, C (2006). "Distinct roles for spontaneous and visual activity in remodeling of the retinogeniculate synapse". Neuron. 52: 281–91. doi:10.1016/j.neuron.2006.07.007. PMID 17046691.
- Hooks, BM; Chen, C (2008). "Vision triggers an experience-dependent sensitive period at the retinogeniculate synapse". J Neurosci. 28: 4807–17. doi:10.1523/JNEUROSCI.4667-07.2008. PMC 2793334. PMID 18448657.
- Noutel, J; Hong, YK; Leu, BH; Kang, E; Chen, C (2011). "Experience-Dependent Retinogeniculate Synapse Remodeling is Abnormal in MeCP2 deficient mice". Neuron. 70: 35–42. doi:10.1016/j.neuron.2011.03.001. PMC 3082316. PMID 21482354.
- Hong, YK; Park, S; Litvina, EY; Morales, J; Sanes, JR; Chen, C (2014). "Refinement of the retinogeniculate synapse by bouton clustering". Neuron. 84: 332–9. doi:10.1016/j.neuron.2014.08.059. PMC 4322918. PMID 25284005.
- Thompson, AD; Picard, N; Min, L; Fagiolini, M; Chen, C (2016). "Cortical Feedback Regulates Feedforward Retinogeniculate Refinement". Neuron. 91: 1021–1033. doi:10.1016/j.neuron.2016.07.040. PMC 5156570. PMID 27545712.
- Litvina, EY; Chen, C (2017). "Functional Convergence at the Retinogeniculate Synapse". Neuron. 96: 330–338.e5. doi:10.1016/j.neuron.2017.09.037. PMC 5726778. PMID 29024658.
- Liang, L; Fratzl, A; Goldey, G; Ramesh, RN; Sugden, AU; Morgan, JL; Chen, C; Andermann, ML (2018). "A Fine-Scale Functional Logic to Convergence from Retina to Thalamus". Cell. 173: 1343–1355.e24. doi:10.1016/j.cell.2018.04.041. PMC 6003778. PMID 29856953.
- Reggiani, JDS; Jiang, Q; Barbini, M; Lutas, A; Liang, L; Fernando, J; Deng, F; Wan, J; Li, Y; Chen, C; Andermann, ML (2023). "Brainstem serotonin neurons selectively gate retinal information flow to thalamus". Neuron. 111: 711–726.e11. doi:10.1016/j.neuron.2022.12.006. PMC 10131437. PMID 36584680.
