= Binocular neurons =

Binocular neurons are neurons in the visual system that assist in the creation of stereopsis from binocular disparity. They have been found in the primary visual cortex where the initial stage of binocular convergence begins. Binocular neurons receive inputs from both the right and left eyes and integrate the signals together to create a perception of depth.

== History ==
In the 19th century Charles Wheatstone determined that retinal disparity was a large contributor to depth perception. Using a stereoscope, he showed that horizontal disparity is used by the brain to calculate the relative depths of different objects in 3-dimensional space in reference to a fixed point. This process is called stereopsis. Two main classes of cells in visual cortex were identified by David H. Hubel and Torsten Wiesel in 1962 through their investigation of the cat's primary visual cortex. These classes were called simple and complex cells, which differ in how their receptive fields respond to light and dark stimuli. Béla Julesz in 1971 used random dot stereograms to find that monocular depth cues, such as shading, are not required for stereoscopic vision. Disparity selective cells were first recorded in the striate cortex (V1) of the cat by Peter Orlebar Bishop and John Douglas Pettigrew in the late 1960s, however this discovery was unexpected and was not published until 1986. These disparity selective cells, also known as binocular neurons, were again found in the awake behaving macaque monkey in 1985. Additionally, population responses of binocular neurons have been found in human ventral and dorsal pathways using fMRI.

== Neuroanatomy ==
The dorsal pathway (green) and ventral pathway (purple) are shown. They originate from the primary visual cortex. Binocular neurons are found throughout both pathways.

Both the dorsal and ventral pathways contribute to the perception of depth. Binocular neurons, in the sense of being activated by stimuli in either eye, are first found in the visual cortex in layer 4. Binocular neurons appear in the striate cortex (V1), the prestriate cortex (V2), the ventral extrastriate area (V4), the dorsal extrastriate area (V5/MT), medial superior temporal area, caudal intraparietal area, and a collection of areas in the anterior inferior temporal cortex. Neurons in the prestriate cortex (V2) are more sensitive to different disparities than those in the striate cortex (V1). Binocular neurons in the striate cortex (V1) are only sensitive to absolute disparity, where in other visual cortical areas they are sensitive to relative disparity.

In the prestriate cortex (V2) and ventral extrastriate area (V4), binocular neurons respond most readily to a centre-surround stimulus. A centre-surround stimulus consists of a fixed object with another object rotating in a circle around the fixed object. Areas in the anterior inferior temporal cortex respond to surface curvature. Binocular neurons in both the caudal intraparietal area and the dorsal extrastriate area (V5/MT) respond to surface slants. Binocular neurons in both the medial superior temporal area and dorsal extrastriate area (V5/MT) respond to surface depth sparation. On one hand, the anticorrelated response of the binocular neurons in the striate cortex (V1), the prestriate cortex (V2), dorsal extrastriate area (V5/MT), and medial superior temporal area, all show similar responses. On the other hand, binocular neurons in the ventral extrastriate area (V4) show weaker anticorrelated responses in comparison to the other areas. Finally, areas in the anterior inferior temporal cortex do not show any anticorrelated response.

== Function ==
Binocular neurons create depth perception through computation of relative and absolute disparity created by differences in the distance between the left and right eyes. Binocular neurons in the dorsal and ventral pathways combine to create depth perception, however, the two pathways perform differ in the type of stereo computation they perform. The dorsal pathway generally performs a cross-correlation based upon the region of the different retinal images, while the ventral pathway fixes the multiple matching problem. In combination, the two pathways allow for judgments about stereo depth. In general the ventral pathway is more sensitive to relative disparity. The cells in this pathway are sensitive to the relative depth between different objects or features close to one another in the physical world which is called fine stereopsis. The dorsal pathway contains cells that are more sensitive to coarse stereopsis. This allows for simple computations of depth based upon the different images in both the left and right eyes, but this computation only occurs when the surfaces analyzed contain a gradient of different depths.

=== Receptive Fields ===
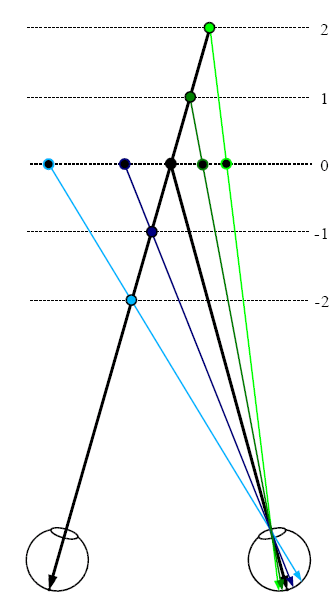
Disparity from planes of different depths. Far cells would respond to disparities on planes 1 and 2. Near cells would respond to disparities on planes -1 and -2. Tuned zero cells would respond to disparities on plane 0, or the plane of fixation.

Simple cells have separate regions in their receptive field that respond to light and dark stimuli. Unlike simple cells, the receptive field of complex cells have a mix of regions that respond to light and dark stimuli. The prevailing theory of how simple and complex cells interact is that cells in the lateral geniculate nucleus stimulate simple cells, and simple cells in turn stimulate complex cells where then a combination of complex cells create depth perception. Three different cell types exist: far cells, near cells, and tuned zero cells. Far cells respond to disparities in planes further away from the plane of fixation, near cells are stimulated by disparities in planes closer than the plane of fixation, and tuned zero cells respond to disparities on the plane of fixation. The plane of fixation is the plane in 3-dimensional space on which the two eyes are focused and is parallel to the coronal plane of the head.

=== Correspondence Problem ===
The correspondence problem questions how the visual system determines what features or objects contained within the two retinal images come from the same real world objects. For example, when looking at a picture of a tree, the visual system must determine that the two retinal images of the tree come from the same actual object in space. If the correspondence problem is not overcome in this case, the organism would perceive two trees when there is only one. In order to solve this problem, the visual system must have a way of avoiding false-matches of the two retinal images. A possible way the visual system avoids false-matches is that binocular complex cells have cross-matching patches between their receptive fields, meaning that multiple complex cells would be stimulated by same feature. Simulation of real binocular complex cells involves a hierarchical squared summation of multiple simple cell receptive fields where the simple cells sum the contribution from both the right and left retinal images.

=== Energy Models ===
An energy model, a kind of stimulus-response model, of binocular neurons allows for investigation behind the computational function these disparity tuned cells play in the creation of depth perception. Energy models of binocular neurons involve the combination of monocular receptive fields that are either shifted in position or phase. These shifts in either position or phase allow for the simulated binocular neurons to be sensitive to disparity. The relative contributions of phase and position shifts in simple and complex cells combine together in order to create depth perception of an object in 3-dimensional space. Binocular simple cells are modeled as linear neurons. Due to the linear nature of these neurons, positive and negative values are encoded by two neurons where one neuron encodes the positive part and the other the negative part. This results in the neurons being complements of each other where the excitatory region of one binocular simple cell overlaps with the inhibitory region of another. Each neuron's response is limited such that only one may have a non-zero response for any time. This kind of limitation is called halfwave-rectifing. Binocular complex cells are modeled as energy neurons since they do not have discrete on and off regions in their receptive fields. Energy neurons sum the squared responses of two pairs of linear neurons which must be 90 degrees out of phase. Alternatively, they can also be the sum the squared responses of four halfwave-rectified linear neurons.

==== Stereo Model ====
The stereo model is an energy model that integrates both the position-shift model and the phase-difference model. The position-shift model suggests that the receptive fields of left and right simple cells are identical in shape but are shifted horizontally relative to each other. This model was proposed by Bishop and Pettigrew in 1986. According to the phase-difference model the excitatory and inhibitory sub-regions of the left and right receptive fields of simple cells are shifted in phase such that their boundaries overlap. This model was developed by Ohzawa in 1990. The stereo model uses Fourier phase dependence of simple cell responses, and it suggests that the use of the response of only simple cells is not enough to accurately depict the physiological observations found in cat, monkey, and human visual pathways. In order to make the model more representative of physiological observations, the stereo model combines the responses of both simple and complex cells into a single signal. How this combination is done depends on the incoming stimulus. As one example, the model uses independent Fourier phases for some types of stimuli, and finds the preferred disparity of the complex cells equal to the left-right receptive field shift. For other stimuli, the complex cell becomes less phase sensitive than the simple cells alone, and when the complex cells larger receptive field is included in the model, the phase sensitivity is returns to results similar to normal physiological observations. In order to include the larger receptive fields of complex cells, the model averages several pairs of simple cells nearby and overlaps their receptive fields to construct the complex cell model. This allows the complex cell to be phase independent for all stimuli presented while still maintaining an equal receptive field shift to the simple cells it is composed of in the model.

The stereo model is then made from a multitude of complex cell models that have differing disparities covering a testable range of disparities. Any individual stimulus is then distinguishable through finding the complex cell in the population with the strongest response to the stimuli. The stereo model accounts for most non-temporal physiological observations of binocular neurons as well as the correspondence problem. An important aspect of the stereo model is it accounts for disparity attraction and repulsion. An example of disparity attraction and repulsion is that at a close distance two objects appear closer in depth than in actuality, and at further distances from each other they appear further in depth than in actuality. Disparity attraction and repulsion is believed to be directly related to the physiological properties of binocular neurons in the visual cortex. Use of the stereo model has allowed for interpretation of the source of differing peak locations found in disparity tuning curves of some cells in visual cortex. These differing peak locations of the disparity tuning curves are called characteristic disparity. Due to the lack of defined disparity tuning curves for simple cells, they cannot have characteristic disparities., but the characteristic disparities can be attributed to complex cells instead. Two limitations of the stereo model is that it does not account for the response of binocular neurons in time, and that it does not give much insight into connectivity of binocular neurons.

== See also ==
- Binocular rivalry
- Binocular vision
- Eye dominance
- Eye movements
- Field of view
- Horopter
- Interpupillary distance
- Monocular vision
- Stereoblindness
- Stereopsis
- Stereopsis recovery
- Stereoscopy
- Vision
