= Department of Neurobiology, Harvard Medical School =

Academic Department at Harvard University Medical School, USA

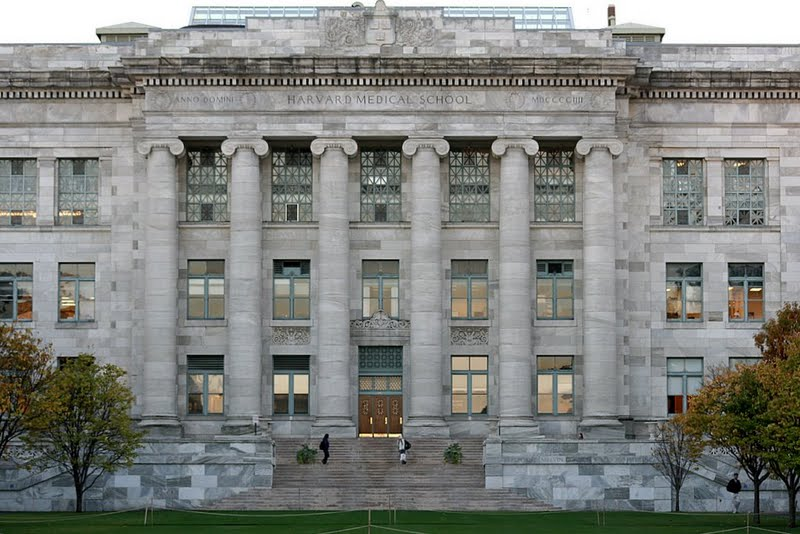
- Established: 1966
- Chairman: David D. Ginty
- Location: Boston, MA
- Website: http://neuro.hms.harvard.edu

The Department of Neurobiology at Harvard Medical School is located in the Longwood Medical Area of Boston, MA. The Department is part of the Basic Research Program at Harvard Medical School, with research pertaining to development of the nervous system, sensory neuroscience, neurophysiology, and behavior. The Department was founded by Stephen W. Kuffler in 1966, the first department dedicated to neurobiology in the world. The mission of the department is “to understand the workings of the brain through basic research and to use that knowledge to work toward preventive and therapeutic methods that alleviate neurological diseases”.

== History ==
Prior to moving to Boston, while at Johns Hopkins University, Kuffler recruited Torsten N. Wiesel, David Hubel, David Potter, and Edwin Furshpan to work on various aspects of nerve physiology. As Hubel later recounted, Wiesel, Hubel, and Kuffler "...represented central nervous system physiology; Furshpan and Potter (and of course Steve) represented synaptic physiology; and Ed Kravitz, representing neurochemistry, arrived soon after our move to Harvard."

The group moved to Harvard Medical School in 1959 as a sub-department within the Department of Pharmacology, headed by Otto Krayer. In 1966, Kuffler came up with the term neurobiology to unite these sub-disciplines into the first-ever Department of Neurobiology, an independent department at Harvard Medical School. Hubel later said, “I can’t be absolutely certain how the term neurobiology originated, but I believe Steve Kuffler invented it when we had to think up a title for our department when it was founded on 1965. That he almost single-handedly invented the field of neurobiology, I think few would dispute.”

Early on, the founders of the department worked to recruit students and researchers to work in their laboratories, and paid special attention to recruiting with a social conscience. According to David Potter, "There’s another fact of the department that interests me personally, [that] has to do with our involvement in acceptance of medical students who were minorities… it was something new, and it was a political struggle and that made it very interesting. I spent a lot of time there, time that I should have been spending in the lab doing science and research, on admissions and recruiting, and I got kind of devoted to that. I don’t regret that at all, it was an education for me."

Wiesel chaired the department from 1973, and was succeeded by David Potter in 1982, Gerald Fishbach in 1990, and Carla Shatz in 2000 (the first woman to chair such a department). In 2008, Michael E. Greenberg assumed the position of Department chair, a position he held until 2022. Under his leadership, he has integrated Harvard Neurobiology with neuroscience in the Harvard-affiliated hospitals, such as Boston Children’s Hospital, Dana-Farber Cancer Center, Massachusetts General Hospital, and the Massachusetts Eye and Ear Infirmary. To further facilitate the interaction and collaboration of neuroscientists at Harvard University in Cambridge, MA and Harvard Medical School, the Harvard Brain Initiative, co-chaired by Michael Greenberg and Joshua Sanes, funds collaborations and research initiatives specifically between members of the Department faculty and other neuroscientists at Harvard University.

David D. Ginty assumed the role of chair in 2022.

In October 2016, current and past faculty, students, and researchers will gather in Boston to celebrate the 50th Anniversary of the founding of the Department.

== Notable contributions to neurobiology ==
- Receptive fields in visual cortex: pioneering work on the selective responses of retinal ganglion cells by Kuffler
- Discovery of critical periods, ocular dominance columns, and orientation selectivity: Hubel and Wiesel discovered that experience can shape the brain’s circuitry, but only during early life, a period of time they call the ‘critical period’. This work in the visual cortex earned the duo the Nobel Prize in Physiology or Medicine in 1981.
- Development of electrodes: Hubel developed an electrode for recording of single neurons in awake cats.
- Kravitz, Potter, and colleagues define GABA as an inhibitory neurotransmitter
- Activity-dependent transcription in neurons during development of neural circuits, and in neurodevelopmental disorders
- Central sensitization in pain
- Processing of sub-modalities of vision in primates
- Cortical area specifically dedicated to face recognition
- Fundamental principles of olfactory processing
- Characterization and modulation of nicotinic acetylcholine receptors and discovery of rapsyn
- Molecular and biophysical analysis of auditory hair cells
- Novel GABAergic pathway from basal ganglia to cortex
- Discovery of enhancer RNA, RNA transcribed at enhancer sites in the genome
- The molecular impact of the ketogenic diet in epilepsy
- Blood brain barrier development and regulation
- Real-time 3D imaging of mouse behavior to phenotype and analyze mouse behavior
- Timing of neurotransmitter release from synapse and asynchronous release from synapses
- Role of CRY1 and CRY2 in mammalian circadian clock
- New treatment target for glioblastoma
- Pain receptor specific local anesthesia

== Current research and academic staff ==
The department currently has 38 faculty members and close to 300 graduate students, post-doctoral fellows, and other research staff.

The department’s current research generally encompasses the following areas:

- Development and plasticity of the brain
- Characterization of GABA and other amine neurotransmitters
- Sensory neuroscience and processing in Drosophila melanogaster, mice, and nonhuman primates
- Ion channel physiology
- Neurobiology of behavior
- Neurodevelopmental disorders, such as Rett syndrome and autism spectrum disorder
- Neuropsychiatric disorders
- Development of technologies to activate and monitor neuronal activity
- Regulation of sleep and circadian rhythms

The department's faculty also participates in the Program in Neuroscience PhD Program offered by Harvard University.

== Select awards and honors for past and current faculty members ==
Nobel Prize in Physiology or Medicine:

- 1981: Torsten N. Wiesel and David Hubel "for their discoveries concerning information processing in the visual system"
- 2003: Roderick MacKinnon (faculty member 1992–96) "for structural and mechanistic studies of ion channels"
- 2004: Linda Buck (faculty member 1991–2001) "for...discoveries of odorant receptors and the organization of the olfactory system"

Albert Lasker Award for Basic Medical Research:

- 1999: Roderick MacKinnon (faculty member 1992–96)

NIH Director's Pioneer Awards:

- 2006: Rosalind A. Segal (current faculty member)
- 2012: Gary Yellen (current faculty member)
- 2014: Chenghua Gu (current faculty member)

NIH Director's New Innovator Awards:

- 2010: S. Robert Datta (current faculty member)
- 2016: Dragana Rogulja (current faculty member)

Gruber Prize in Neuroscience:

- 2014: Thomas Jessell (faculty member 1981–84)
- 2015: Michael E. Greenberg (current chair and faculty member) and Carla Shatz (chair and faculty member, 2000–07)

American Academy of Arts and Sciences

- 1976: Edward Kravitz
- 2014: Bernardo L. Sabatini
- 2015: Margaret Livingstone
