= Ferrier Lecture =

UK science lecturship

The Ferrier Lecture is a Royal Society lectureship given every three years "on a subject related to the advancement of natural knowledge on the structure and function of the nervous system". It was created in 1928 to honour the memory of Sir David Ferrier, a neurologist who was the first British scientist to electronically stimulate the brain for the purpose of scientific study.

In its 90-year history, the Lecture has been given 30 times. It has never been given more than once by the same person. The first female to be awarded the honour was Prof. Christine Holt in 2017. The first lecture was given in 1929 by Charles Scott Sherrington, and was titled "Some functional problems attaching to convergence". The most recent lecturer was provided by Prof. Christine Holt, who presented a lecture in 2017 titled "understanding of the key molecular mechanisms involved in nerve growth, guidance and targeting which has revolutionised our knowledge of growing axon tips". In 1971, the lecture was given by two individuals (David Hunter Hubel and Torsten Nils Wiesel) on the same topic, with the title "The function and architecture of the visual cortex".

== List of Lecturers ==
Year	Name	Lecture title	Notes
1929	Charles Scott Sherrington	"Some functional problems attaching to convergence"	
1932	C. U. Ariëns Kappers	"Some correlations between skull and brain"	
1935	Otto Loewi	"Problems connected with the principle of humeral transmission of nervous impulses"	–
1938	Edgar Douglas Adrian	"Some problems of localization in the central nervous system"	
1941	Frederic Charles Bartlett	"Fatigue following highly skilled work"	
1944	Gordon Morgan Holmes	"The organization of the visual cortex in man"	
1947	Wilder Penfield	"Some observations of the cerebral cortex of Man"	
1950	John Zachary Young	"Growth and plasticity in the nervous system"	–
1953	Francis Martin Rouse Walshe	"The contribution of clinical observation to cerebral physiology"	
1956	Wilfrid Edward Le Gros Clark	"Inquiries into the anatomical basis of olfactory discrimination"	
1959	John Carew Eccles	"The nature of central inhibitory action"	
1962	William Albert Hugh Rushton	"Visual adaptation"	
1965	Stephen William Kuffler	"Physiological properties of vertebrate and invertebrate neurological cells and the movement of substances through the nervous system"	
1968	Charles Garrett Phillips	"Studies of a primates brain and hand"	
1971	David Hunter Hubel and Torsten Nils Wiesel	"The function and architecture of the visual cortex"	
1974	Wilhelm Siegmund Feldberg	"Body temperature and fever, changes in our views during the last decade"	
1977	Janos Szentagothai	"The neuron network of the cerebral cortex, a functional interpretation"	
1980	Horace Basil Barlow	"Cerebral cortex and the design of the eye"	–
1983	Leslie Lars Iversen	"Amino acids and peptides: fast and slow chemical signals in the nervous system"	–
1986	Giles Brindley	"The actions of parasympathetic and sympathetic nerves in human micturition, erection and seminal emission, and their restoration in paraplegic patients by implanted electrical stimulators"	–
1989	Lawrence Weiskrantz	"Side glances at blindsight, recent approaches to implicit discrimination in human cortical blindness"	
1992	Gerald Westheimer	"Seeing depth with two eyes, stereopsis"	
1995	Semir Zeki	"Behind the scene: an exploration of the visual brain"	
1998	Jean-Pierre Changeux	"The nicotinic acetylcholine receptor and synaptic plasticity"	
2001	Andrew Lumsden	"Patterning the embryonic brain"	–
2004	Alan Cowey	"Magnetic brain stimulation: what can it tell us about brain function?"	
2007	Marc Tessier-Lavigne	"Brain development and brain repair: Molecules and mechanisms that control neuronal wiring"	–
2010	Colin Blakemore	"Plasticity of the brain: the key to human development, cognition and evolution"	
2013	John O'Keefe	"cognitive neuroscience, especially on the role of the hippocampus, and the mechanisms supporting memory and cognition"	
2017	Christine Holt	"understanding of the key molecular mechanisms involved in nerve growth, guidance and targeting which has revolutionised our knowledge of growing axon tips"	
2019	Ray Dolan	"for his work charting the brain activity related to fundamental aspects of human conduct and behaviour"	
2021	Daniel Wolpert	"for groundbreaking contributions to our understanding of how the brain controls movement. Using theoretical and experimental approaches he has elucidated the computational principles underlying skilled motor behaviour."	
2023	Richard G. Morris	"for greatly advancing the understanding of the physiological and psychological processes underlying memory."	
2025	Gillian Bates	"for her work in understanding the molecular basis of Huntington’s disease and consistently producing highly impactful findings which have moulded the course of this field."	
