= Andrew Lumsden =

Andrew Lumsden may refer to:

- Andrew Lumsden (bishop) (1654–1733), Bishop of Edinburgh 1727–1733
- Andrew Lumisden or Lumsden (1720–1801), Scottish Jacobite, private secretary to Prince Charles Edward Stuart and joint founder of the Royal Society of Edinburgh
- Andrew Lumsden (scientist) (born 1947), English neurobiologist
- Andrew Lumsden (choral director) (born 1962), British organist and choral director
- Te Radar, New Zealand comedian, born Andrew J. Lumsden
