= Thomas Schwarz =

American neuroscientist and molecular biologist

- Born: New York
- Education: Harvard College, Harvard Medical School
- Scientific career
- Fields: Genetics, neurobiology
- Workplaces: Harvard University
- Doctoral advisor: Edward Kravitz

Thomas L Schwarz is an American neuroscientist and molecular biology researcher at Children's Hospital, Boston, and a professor of Neurology and Neurobiology in the Department of Neurobiology at Harvard Medical School.

Thomas Schwarz is best known for discovering and characterizing the Drosophila protein Milton. This protein has been shown to be crucial to mitochondrial localization to the nerve terminal.

== Education ==
Thomas Schwarz graduated from Harvard College, where he was heavily involved with the college's WHRB radio, before earning a PhD from Harvard Medical School. His doctoral advisor was scientist Edward Kravitz.
