= Orientation selectivity =

Orientation selectivity is expressed by cells within the visual cortex, when such cells increase impulse or signal activity for specific oriented degree of lines or bars presented within the visual field. Orientation selectivity can also be expressed by simple cells if the orientation of a stimulus is orthogonal to the preferred degree of orientation, which results in the inhibition of impulse activity.

== Orientation testing ==
Single receptive field cells across the retina, LGN, and primary visual cortex are in a state of continuous neurotransmission. Impulse activity is the continuous state of regular and constant neurotransmission between neurons.

Tests conducted by David H. Hubel and Torsten N. Wiesel (1968) utilized a single light dot presented within the visual field of a house cat to map out the location of a cell's receptive field within the cat's visual field.

Orientation selectivity as it was first seen and measured in the cat's visual cortex via microelectrode analysis paired with visual stimulus.

Once the receptive field of a cell had been completely mapped out, it was found that some of the simple cell receptive fields mapped out had a region which excited for a stimulus sandwiched between two inhibitory regions. These inhibitory and excitatory regions together formed a single receptive field selective for stimulus shape fitting within the excitatory region.

Only a bar of light stimulus oriented at the correct angle and position within the receptive field covering only the excitatory region excluding the two inhibitory regions would express the greatest increase in the rate of impulse activity for that cell.

Some layers of the striate cortex were found to contain orientation and direction selective cells. These cells were referred to as complex cells, and consisted of several orientation selective simple cells inputting into a single Complex cell. This was believed to result in a cell selective for direction and motion input. These receptive fields were called simple cell receptive fields, and were believed consist of single center-surround LGN input.

A theoretical analysis of how the orientation selectivity of simple cells and complex cells in the primary visual cortex relate to inherent properties of visual receptive fields is given in.
