= Enroth =

Enroth is a surname. Notable people with the surname include:

- Christina Enroth-Cugell (1919–2016), vision scientist
- Jhonas Enroth (born 1988), Swedish ice hockey player
- Ronald Enroth (born 1938), American sociologist

== See also ==
- A fictional continent in 3DO's Might and Magic series
