= Antony Stretton =

Antony O. W. Stretton
- Education: University of Cambridge
- Awards: University of Wisconsin–Madison Distinguished Teaching Awards: Chancellor's Award
- Scientific career
- Fields: Neuroscience, Neurobiology, Neurochemistry, Neuroproteomics, Neurophysiology, Cell Biology, Molecular Biology, Molecular Neuroscience, Electrophysiology
- Workplaces: University of Wisconsin–Madison
- Doctoral advisor: Vernon M. Ingram
- Other academic advisors: Sydney Brenner: Advisor, Post-Doctoral Fellowship (1961-1971), Edward A. Kravitz: Advisor, Post-Doctoral Fellowship (1966-1968)
- Doctoral students: Pat Hanrahan

Antony "Tony" Oliver Ward Stretton is a neuroscientist, faculty member of the Neuroscience Training Program, and the John Bascom Professor of Zoology at the University of Wisconsin–Madison. He is married to fellow scientist, Philippa Claude, daughter of Albert Claude.

Stretton worked with Vernon M. Ingram first in the United Kingdom at the Cavendish Laboratory of the University of Cambridge then in the United States at the Massachusetts Institute of Technology as well as with Edward A. Kravitz at the Medical School of Harvard University. He has also done research at the Marine Biological Laboratory in Woods Hole, Massachusetts.

== Honors and awards ==
- Distinguished Teaching Awards: Chancellor's Award, University of Wisconsin–Madison (2007)
- Fellow, American Association for the Advancement of Science

== Selected publications ==
- Ingram, V. M. and A. O. W. Stretton, (1959) "Genetic basis of the thalassaemia diseases", Nature, 184:1903-1909.[CrossRef][Medline]
- Ingram, V. M. and A. O. W. Stretton, (1961) "Human haemoglobin A2: chemistry, genetics and evolution", Nature 190:1079-1084
- Ingram, V. M. and A. O. W. Stretton, (1962) "Human haemoglobin A2. I. Comparisons of haemoglobins A2 and A", Biochim. Biophys. Acta 62:456-474
- Ingram, V. M. and A. O. W. Stretton, (1962) "Human haemoglobin A2. II. The chemistry of some peptides peculiar to haemoglobin A2", Biochim. Biophys. Acta 63:20-33
- Stretton A.O., Kravitz E.A., (1968), "Neuronal geometry: determination with a technique of intracellular dye injection", Science, 162: p. 132-4. Science 4 October 1968: Vol. 162. no. 3849, pp. 132 – 134
- Stretton A.O.W. (2002) "The First Sequence: Fred Sanger and Insulin", Genetics, Vol. 162, 527-532, October 2002,
- Stretton, A. O. W., Ph.D. Thesis, Univ. Cambridge (1960)
