= Gerald Westheimer =

Australian scientist (born 1924)

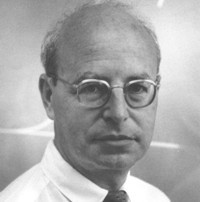
- Westheimer, c. 1970
- Born: 13 May 1924 (age 101); Berlin, Germany
- Occupation: Scientist
- Organization: University of California, Berkeley

Gerald Westheimer AM FRS (born 13 May 1924) is an Australian scientist at University of California, Berkeley researching the eye, its optics, and how we see details in space and in three dimensions.

== Life and career ==
Westheimer was born on 13 May 1924 in Berlin into an observant Jewish family—long settled in Germany and traced back at least Joseph Aaron Westheimer who had been born in 1768 in Menzingen, Baden (Joseph was granted special residential status as a "protected Jew"). Westheimer is the younger of two sons. In 1938, state-sanctioned attacks against Jews in Nazi Germany prompted the family to emigrate to Australia, settling in Sydney.

Shortly after arriving in Sydney, Westheimer completed high-school by self-study and enrolled in the professional Optometry program at the Sydney Technical College, from which he graduated with honours and the College Medal in 1943. While practising optometry he pursued further study, leading to a BSc in mathematics and physiology from Sydney University and submission of a thesis for the Fellowship of the Sydney Technical College.

In 1951, Westheimer went to the US, first as a graduate student at Ohio State University (PhD, Physics-Physiological Optics) with Glenn A. Fry, influenced by Paul Fitts, and then in various professorial ranks in optometry schools of the University of Houston, Ohio State and University of California, Berkeley, interrupted by post-doctoral studies at the Marine Biological Laboratory in Woods Hole and at the Physiological Laboratory of the University of Cambridge. In 1960, he was appointed as an associate professor at the School of Optometry at Berkeley, becoming professor in 1963. In 1967, he joined Berkeley's Department of Physiology-Anatomy, later merged into the Department of Cell and Molecular Biology, in which he established and headed the Division of Neurobiology until becoming professor in the Graduate School in 1994. Since 1994 he has also been a member of the adjunct faculty of the Laboratory of Neurobiology of Rockefeller University in New York.

Westheimer never relinquished the Australian citizenship gained by naturalisation. Appointment to membership in the Order of Australia in 2009 recognised his continued identification with the country that provided refuge from the Holocaust.

Appreciations of Westheimer's scientific and academic contributions have appeared at various stages of his career. In addition there is an autobiographical sketch.

According to the academic genealogy site Neurotree, Westheimer has 11 academic children and 99 academic grandchildren.

== Research ==
Even as a boy, Westheimer was interested in astronomy, optics, and the eye. He pursued these interests, mainly in human vision, in his long research career.

As of May 2014, Westheimer has published over 200 scientific papers. He has an h-index, based on Web of Science, of 39. Publications include:

- Westheimer, G. (1957). Kinematics of the eye. Journal of the Optical Society of America, 47, 967–974.
- Westheimer, G. (1960), Modulation thresholds for sinusoidal light distribution on the retina. Journal of Physiology, 152, 67–74.
- Westheimer, G., & Campbell, F. W. (1962). Light distribution in the image formed by the living human eye. Journal of the Optical Society of America, 52, 1040–1045.
- Westheimer, G. (1965). Spatial interaction in the human retina during scotopic vision. Journal of Physiology, 181, 881–894.
- Westheimer, G. (1966). The Maxwellian view. Vision Research, 6, 669–682.
- Westheimer, G. (1967). Spatial interaction in human cone vision. Journal of Physiology, 190, 139–154.
- Westheimer, G. (1975). Visual acuity and hyperacuity. Investigative Ophthalmology, 14, 570–572.
- Gilbert, C., Ito, M., Kapadia, M., & Westheimer, G. (2000 ). Interactions between attention, context and learning in primary visual cortex. Vision Research, 40, 1217–1226.
- Westheimer, G. (2005). The resolving power of the eye. Vision Research, 45, 945–947.

== Music and philanthropy ==
Westheimer is an accomplished recreational violinist and has donated a number of fine 19th-century violins to the Sydney Conservatorium of Music, along with an endowment for their upkeep. According to Westheimer, the purpose of this collection is to “enable talented young Australian artists studying at the Conservatorium to perfect their performance skills on high quality instruments”.

== Recognitions ==
Scientific

- 1978 Tillyer Medal, Optical Society of America
- 1979 Proctor Medal, Association for Research in Vision and Ophthalmology (ARVO)
- 1984 Fellow, Royal Society of London
- 1986 von Sallman International Prize in Vision and Ophthalmology, Columbia University
- 1986 C.F. Prentice Medal, American Academy of Optometry
- 1988 Bicentennial Medal, Australian Optometric Association
- 1992 Ferrier Lecture, Royal Society of London
- 1994 Fellow, American Academy of Arts and Sciences
- 2010 Barry Collin Research Medal, Optometrists Association of Australia
- 2021 Ken Nakayama Medal for Excellence in Vision Science

Academic

- Honorary Doctorates in Science and Medicine

General

- Order of Australia, member of General Division
