= List of fellows of the Royal Society elected in 1982 =

This is a list of fellows of the Royal Society elected in 1982.

== Fellows ==
1. James Derek Birchall (1930–1995)
2. William Maxwell Cowan (1931–2002)
3. Ulrich Wolfgang Arndt (1924–2006)
4. Anthony David Bradshaw (d. 2008)
5. Amos Henry Chilver Baron Chilver of Cranfield (d. 2012)
6. Rodney James Baxter
7. Sir Michael Victor Berry
8. Lawrence Michael Brown
9. Daniel McGillivray Brown
10. Bryan Campbell Clarke
11. Alan William Cuthbert
12. John Thomas Finch
13. Henry Edgar Hall
14. Michael Hart
15. Eric John Hewitt (1919–2002)
16. Sir Charles Antony Richard Hoare
17. Robert Francis Hudson (d. 2012)
18. William Johnson
19. Kenneth Langstreth Johnson
20. Sir Peter Julius Lachmann
21. Ralph Lainson
22. Michael Francis Land
23. Peter John Lawrenson
24. William Russell Levick
25. Stephen Finney Mason (d. 2007)
26. Noreen Elizabeth Murray (1935–2011)
27. Sir Gustav Joseph Victor Nossal
28. William James Peacock (1937–2025)
29. Phillip James Edwin Peebles
30. Peter Rainger
31. Chintamani Nagesa Ramachandra Rao
32. Lewis Edward John Roberts (d. 2012)
33. George Stanley Rushbrooke (1915–1995)
34. John George Sclater
35. Graeme Bryce Segal
36. David Rostron Trentham
37. Stewart Turner, geophysicist
38. Thomas Gaskell Tutin (1908–1987)
39. Ronald Harry Ottewill (d. 2008)
40. John Conrad Waterlow (d. 2010)

== Foreign members ==
1. David Hunter Hubel (1926–2013)
2. Evgenii Mikhailovich Lifshitz (1915–1985)
3. Warner Tjardus Koiter (1914–1997)
4. Torsten Nils Wiesel
