= Wade Regehr =

Professor of Neurobiology

Wade G. Regehr
- Born: Shaunavon, Saskatchewan, Canada
- Education: California Institute of Technology
- Scientific career
- Fields: Neuroscience
- Workplaces: Harvard Medical School
- Doctoral advisor: David Rutledge

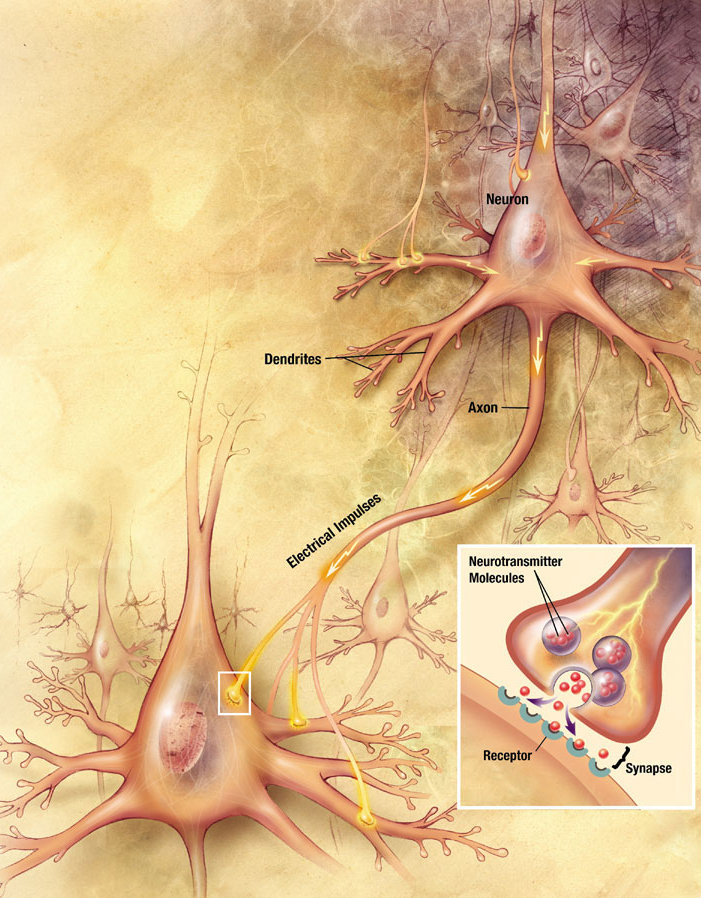
Illustration of the major elements in chemical synaptic transmission. An electrochemical wave called an action potential travels along the axon of a neuron. When the wave reaches a synapse, it provokes release of a puff of neurotransmitter molecules, which bind to chemical receptor molecules located in the membrane of another neuron, on the opposite side of the synapse.

Schematic of a chemical synapse between an axon of one neuron and a dendrite of another. Synapses are specialised minute gaps between neurons. The electrical impulses arriving at the axon terminal triggers the release of packets of chemical messengers (neurotransmitters), which diffuse across the synaptic cleft to receptors on the adjacent dendrite temporarily affecting the likelihood that an electrical impulse will be triggered in the latter neuron. Once released the neurotransmitter is rapidly metabolised or is pumped pack into a neuron.

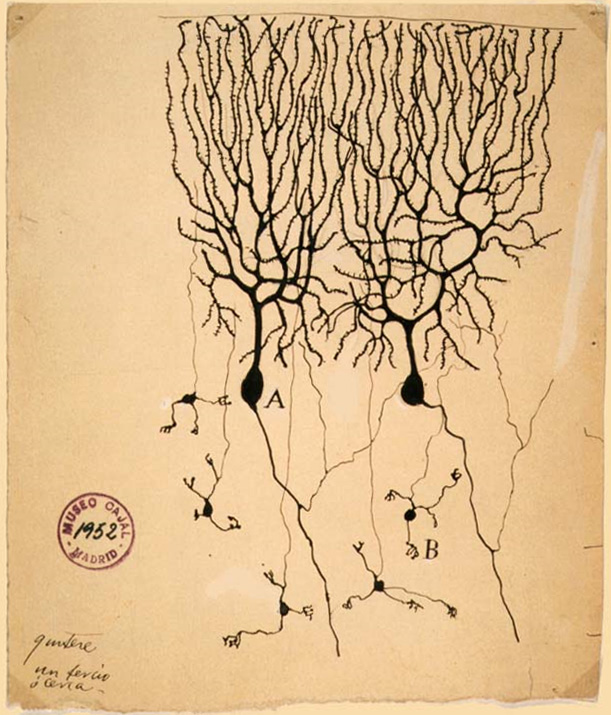
Drawing by Santiago Ramón y Cajal of neurons in the pigeon cerebellum. (A) Denotes Purkinje cells, an example of a bipolar neuron. (B) Denotes which are multipolar.

Wade G. Regehr is a Professor of Neurobiology at Harvard Medical School's Department of Neurobiology.

== Early biography ==
Born in Shaunavon, Saskatchewan, Canada, Regehr attended the University of Regina in Canada where he received the Governor General's Award, then received his Ph.D. at Caltech in applied physics with David Rutledge. His doctorate was at the interface between neuroscience and electrical engineering.

== Research ==
Regehr's laboratory studies the implication of calcium Ca^{2+} as it affects synaptic strength. Neurons communicate with one another via synapses. Regehr was one of the first to use fluorescent imaging to see the synaptic activity occurring in the brain. A dye alters the fluorescence properties when attached to calcium, and changes in intracellular calcium are associated with neuronal activity (firing of action potentials). Using fluorescence-microscopy techniques, calcium levels are detected, and therefore the influx of calcium in the presynaptic neuron.

Calcium processes affect the release of neurotransmitter from the axon terminal. (Occasionally this happens in reverse).

Chemical synapses are characterized by the presynaptic release of neurotransmitters that diffuse across a synaptic cleft to bind with postsynaptic receptors. A neurotransmitter is a chemical messenger that is synthesized within neurons themselves and released by these same neurons to communicate with their postsynaptic target cells. By studying the physiological process and mechanisms, a further understanding is made of synaptic depression and delayed release of the neurotransmitter, synaptic potentiation, facilitation and other calcium dependent chemical processes.

== Awards ==
Regehr received the Governor General's Award after receiving his undergraduate degree from the University of Regina. Regehr has been awarded the Senator Jacob Javits Award in the Neurosciences. This award provides funding for a possible seven years to research neurological disorders. The funding is provided by the National Institute of Neurological Disorders and Stroke (NINDS). Regehr's study of short term synaptic plasticity (synapse strength during behavioral tasks) is relevant to neurological disorders such as epilepsy, schizophrenia and depression.

Regehr also was granted a scholar award from The McKnight Endowment Fund for Neuroscience for The Role of Presynaptic Calcium in Plasticity at Central Synapses in 1993. The McKnight Scholar Awards are given to PhD candidates who have an interest in the study of disorders affecting learning and memory. The funding establishes laboratories for emerging neuroscientists who can develop clinical neuroscience research.

== See also ==
- Axon terminals
