= Táp =

- Flag Coat of arms

- Location of Győr-Moson-Sopron county in Hungary

- Location of Táp
- Coordinates: 47.51649°N 17.82922°E
- Country: Hungary
- County: Győr-Moson-Sopron

Area
  - Total: 19.88 km^{2} (7.68 sq mi)

Population (2004)
  - Total: 722
  - Density: 36.31/km^{2} (94.0/sq mi)
- Time zone: UTC+1 (CET)
  - Summer (DST): UTC+2 (CEST)
- Postal code: 9095
- Area code: 96

Táp is a village in Győr-Moson-Sopron county, Hungary.

In 1588 it was undivided property of Count János Cseszneky and András Farkas, later was in the hands of Cseszneky heirs.

== History ==
The village is first mentioned in a 1237 decree where it is referred to as Tapan. Over time the name was shortened to its current form. According to another document from the end of the 13th century the village contained 195 houses however was nearly destroyed by fire in 1881. The town's name was formally registered as Táp in 1898 and the village's current flag and crest was registered in 1992.

As a result of land reform following World War I the land within the village was broken up into smaller parcels. In further land reform following World War II 621 families were allotted 1800 kilo-hectares. The 1950s saw the collectivization and privatization of the village's agricultural lands. Private land ownership was reinstated during the transition from socialism in 1993-1994 and the collective was replaced by a 20-member agricultural production cooperative.

From 1969 to 1990 the village was administered by a regional council along with the neighboring villages Gyorasszonyfá and Tápszentmiklós. Since January 1, 1990 the village has an independent, locally elected municipal government.

== Notable people ==
- Stephen William Kuffler (1913–1980), neurophysiologist, was born in Táp.

== Geography ==
Táp is a Hungarian village located just south of Gyor on the eastern side of the Pannonhalma (Sokoró) Hills. Lying at the edge of the Western Hungarian Plains and the beginning of the Bakony hills, the area around the village is a mix of steep forested hillsides and open meadow. Gyor is the nearest large city and can be reached directly by bus. The nearest train station is a few kilometers away in the neighbouring village of Gyorasszonyfa.

== Demographics ==
The village has a current population of 745. The local elementary school, which also serves the children of Nyalka and Pázmandfalu, is also located in the village. Agriculture dominates the local economy however many inhabitants commute to Gyor for work. Agriculture in the village consists of farming and livestock rearing facilities just outside the village limits.

== Culture ==
Historic Lane and National Folk Monument

Nestled in the hills of the village is a group of farm homes dating back to the late 18th and early 19th centuries with the oldest built in 1792. The homes are typical examples of central European adobe peasant homes with pole construction, thatched roofs, thick adobe walls and small windows. The fact they are grouped together makes this area unique and gives visitors a sense of what pheasant life would have been like in the 19th century. The area is made up of 11 plots and received National Monument status in the 1970s. The village owns 8 of the 11 original plots, these areas and buildings are administered by Attila Balogh. Over the years repeated attempts have been made to preserve and restore the buildings. Among the remaining buildings is one home fully furnished with artifacts from the era that serves as a folk museum.

Spring Festival (Hegysor Tavasz)

Since 1991 the lane is also the site of the village's annual spring festival which celebrates the villages history and Hungarian Folk culture. Generally held around Pentecost in late April or early May the festival features crafts, regional cuisine, contests, folk music, and folk dance groups.
