= Alan Cowey =

British neuroscientist

Alan Cowey (28 April 1935 – 19 December 2012) was a British scientist and academic, and the Emeritus Professor of Physiological Psychology at the University of Oxford. His primary interest was in the way in which we interpret the visual world. He gained a BA from the University of Cambridge in 1957 and a PhD from Cambridge in 1961. He was elected a Fellow of the Royal Society in 1988, and a Fellow of the Academy of Medical Sciences in 1998. In 2000 he received an honorary DSc from the University of Durham, and in 2007 he presented the Royal Society's Ferrier Lecture.
