= Francis Walshe =

British neurologist

Sir Francis Martin Rouse Walshe, FRS (19 September 1885 – 21 February 1973) was a British neurologist.

== Career ==
He was born in London and educated at Prior Park College, Bath from 1898 to 1901 and at University College School, London from 1901 to 1903. He then read medicine at University College Hospital, London from 1903 to 1910 and was awarded BSc in 1908 and MB in 1910. After holding a house appointment at University College for a year he moved to work at the National Hospital, Queen Square, London as House Physician and Resident Medical Officer. He was awarded MD in 1912 and elected a Member of the Royal College of Physicians in 1913.

During the First World War he served in the Royal Army Medical Corps as Consulting Neurologist to the British Forces in Egypt and the Middle East from 1915-1919. He was presented with an OBE in 1919 and elected a Fellow of the Royal College of Physicians in 1920. As a physician he pioneered the description and analysis of human reflexes in physiological terms.

In 1921 he was appointed Honorary Physician at the Queen Square National Hospital and in 1924 Honorary Physician at University College Hospital. He was awarded a DSc in 1924 and from 1937 to 1953 was editor of Brain, in which he published important papers on the function of the cerebral cortex in relation to movement and on neural physiology in relation to the awareness of pain.

He died near Huntingdon in 1973, at age 87.

His son John Michael Walshe made contributions to the treatment of Wilson's disease, using penicillamine on a patient identified by his father.

== Bibliography ==
- Critical Studies in Neurology (E & S Livingstone, Edinburgh, 1948)
- Further Critical Studies in Neurology (E & S Livingstone, Edinburgh & London, 1965)
- The Structure of Medicine and its Place among the Sciences (The Harveian Oration, Royal College of Physicians, E & S Livingstone, Edinburgh, 1948)
- Humanism, History, and Natural Science in Medicine (The Linacre Lecture, E & S Livingstone, Edinburgh, 1950)

== Honours and awards ==
- 1929: Oliver Sharpey Lecture at Royal College of Physicians
- 1941: Honorary doctorate, National University of Ireland
- 1946: Elected a Fellow of the Royal Society.
- 1948: Harveian Oration, Royal College of Physicians of London
- 1950–51: President of the Association of Neurologists
- 1952–54: President of the Royal Society of Medicine
- 1953: Ferrier Lecture, Royal Society
- 1953: Knight Bachelor
- 1959: Honorary doctorate, University of Cincinnati
- 1962–64: President of the Royal Society of Hygiene and Public Health
- 1964: Fellow of University College, London
