= Kenneth L. Johnson =

British engineer (1925–2015)

Kenneth Johnson FRS FREng
- Born: 19 March 1925
- Died: 21 September 2015 (aged 90)
- Education: University of Manchester
- Known for: JKR model
- Awards: William Prager Medal; Royal Medal
- Scientific career
- Fields: Engineering; Contact mechanics
- Workplaces: University of Cambridge
- Thesis: An experimental investigation of the effects of an oscillating tangential force at the interface between elastic bodies in contact (1954)

Kenneth Langstreth Johnson (19 March 1925 – 21 September 2015) was a British engineer, Professor of Engineering at the University of Cambridge from 1977 to 1992 and a Fellow of Jesus College, Cambridge. Most of his research was in the areas of tribology. He is known for developing the JKR model of contact mechanics.

== Education ==
Johnson was educated at Barrow Grammar School and the University of Manchester where he was awarded MScTech, Master of Arts and Doctor of Philosophy degrees supervised by H. Wright Baker.

== Awards and honours ==
Johnson was elected a Fellow of the Royal Academy of Engineering in 1987, a Fellow of the Royal Society (FRS) in 1982 and won their Royal Medal in 2003 "In recognition of his outstanding work in the field of contact mechanics." His 1971 paper with Kevin Kendall and Alan D. Roberts forms the basis of modern theories of contact mechanics. He also made significant contributions to the understanding of fluid rheology under elastohydrodynamic lubrication conditions.

He received the International Award from the Society of Tribologists and Lubrication Engineers in 1983. He was awarded the Tribology Gold Medal from the Institution of Mechanical Engineers in 1985. He was awarded the Mayo D. Hersey Award from the American Society of Mechanical Engineers in 1991. In 1999, Johnson won the William Prager Medal awarded by the Society of Engineering Science. He was also awarded the 2006 Timoshenko Medal.

He died on 21 September 2015.
