= Vernon Ingram =

German-American biologist

Vernon Martin Ingram
- Born: Werner Adolf Martin Immerwahr; 19 May 1924; Breslau, Germany (now Wrocław, Poland)
- Died: 17 August 2006 (aged 82); Boston, Massachusetts
- Education: University of London
- Spouse: Elizabeth Ingram
- Children: Peter, Jennifer
- Awards: William Allan Award (1967)
- Scientific career
- Fields: Biology
- Workplaces: MIT
- Doctoral advisor: Fred Barrow

Vernon Martin Ingram, FRS (May 19, 1924 – August 17, 2006) was a German–American professor of biology at the Massachusetts Institute of Technology.

== Biography ==
Ingram was born Werner Adolf Martin Immerwahr in Breslau, Lower Silesia. When he was 14, he and his family left Nazi Germany because of their opposition to Nazism (being Jewish) and settled in England. He then Anglicised his name to Vernon Ingram.

During the Second World War, Ingram worked at a chemical factory producing drugs for the war effort and at night studied at Birkbeck College at the University of London. He received a bachelor's degree in chemistry in 1945 and a PhD in organic chemistry in 1949.

After receiving his doctorate, Ingram worked at postdoctoral appointments at the Rockefeller Institute and Yale University. At Rockefeller, he worked with Moses Kunitz on crystallising proteins. While at Yale, he studied peptide chemistry with Joseph Fruton. In 1952, Ingram returned to England and started working at the Cavendish Laboratory at the University of Cambridge, studying protein chemistry.

In 1956, Ingram, John A. Hunt, and Antony O. W. Stretton determined that the change in the haemoglobin molecule in sickle cell disease and trait was the substitution of the glutamic acid in position 6 of the β-chain of the normal protein by valine. Ingram used electrophoresis and chromatography to show that the amino acid sequence of normal human and sickle cell anaemia haemoglobins differed due to a single substituted amino acid residue. Much of this work was done with the support of Max Perutz and Francis Crick. Ingram won the William Allan Award from the American Society of Human Genetics in 1967.

This was the first time a researcher demonstrated that a single amino acid exchange in a protein can cause a disease or disorder. As a result, Vernon Ingram is sometimes referred to as "The father of Molecular Medicine."

Ingram joined the MIT faculty in 1958, intending to stay for only one year. He found that he enjoyed it there so much that he stayed on. While at MIT, Ingram collaborated with Paul Marks of Columbia University on haemoglobin research. He was also interested in embryonic haemoglobin and how it differed from that of adults.

By the 1980s, Ingram became interested in neuroscience and especially Alzheimer's disease. His interest was sparked by the work his second wife, Elizabeth (Beth), was doing with intellectually disabled people in the Boston area. She had heard that Down syndrome was a disease of the neurofilaments; this turned out not to be the cause, but it was noted that people with Down syndrome did develop Alzheimer's Disease by the time they were 40.

After retirement, Ingram continued his research, maintaining a small laboratory at MIT. He and his wife, Beth, were housemasters of Ashdown House at MIT for 16 years. Asteroid 6285 Ingram is named in their honour. Ingram was Director of the Experimental Study Group, an alternative undergraduate education community at MIT, from 1989 to 1999. He was elected to the National Academy of Sciences in 2002.

Ingram died in Boston, Massachusetts, on 17 August 2006 of injuries stemming from a fall.

== See also ==
- Intrabody (intracellular antibody)
- Huntingtin and Huntington's disease
- Sickle cell anaemia and Hemoglobin

== Selected publications ==
- Ingram, V.M. (1956). "A Specific Chemical Difference between Globins of Normal and Sickle-cell Anemia Hemoglobins". Nature. 178 (4537): 792–794. Bibcode:1956Natur.178..792I. doi:10.1038/178792a0. PMID 13369537. S2CID 4167855.
- Ingram, V.M. (1957). "Gene Mutations in Human Hemoglobin: The Chemical Difference between Normal and Sickle Hemoglobin". Nature. 180 (4581): 326–328. doi:10.1038/180326a0. PMID 13464827. S2CID 4161107.
- Hunt, J.A.; V.M. Ingram (1958). "Abnormal Human Haemoglobins. II. The Chymotryptic Digestion of the Trypsin-resistant Core of Haemoglobins A and S". Biochimica et Biophysica Acta. 28 (3): 46–549. doi:10.1016/0006-3002(58)90517-1. PMID 13560405.
- Ingram, V.M. (4 March 1961). "Gene Evolution and the Hæmoglobins". Nature. 189 (4766): 704–708. Bibcode:1961Natur.189..704I. doi:10.1038/189704a0. PMID 13717731. S2CID 4201541.
- Winslow, R.M.; V.M. Ingram (10 March 1966). "Peptide Chain Synthesis of Human Hemoglobins A and A_{2}". J. Biol. Chem. 241 (5): 1144–9. doi:10.1016/S0021-9258(18)96814-6. PMID 5933872.
- Ingram, Vernon M. (2004). "Sickle-cell anemia hemoglobin: the molecular biology of the first "molecular disease"--the crucial importance of serendipity" (PDF). Genetics. 167 (1): 1–7. doi:10.1534/genetics.167.1.1. PMC 1470873. PMID 15166132.
- Blanchard, B.J.; A. Chen; C. Kelly; K. Stafford; B. Stockwell; V.M. Ingram (2004). "Novel Compounds eliminate the Neurotoxicity of the Alzheimer Aβ Peptide". Abstr. Massachusetts Alzheimer's Disease Research Center, Annual meeting.
- Ingram, V.M.; B.J. Blanchard; A. Chen; C. Kelly; K. Stafford; B. Stockwell (2004). "Blocking the Initial Molecular Mechanism of Alzheimer's Disease". Abstr. International Congress on Alzheimer's Disease, Philadelphia.
- Ingram, V.M. (2004). "Sickle-cell anemia hemoglobin: the molecular biology of the first "molecular disease"--the crucial importance of serendipity". Genetics. 167 (1): 1–7. doi:10.1534/genetics.167.1.1. PMC 1470873. PMID 15166132.
- Ingram, V.M. (2004). "The Role of Alzheimer Aβ Peptides in Ion Transport across Cell Membranes, in Subcellular Biochemistry: Alzheimer's Disease". In Harris, R.; Fahrenholz, F. (eds.). Cellular and Molecular Aspects of Amyloid. London: Kluwer Academic/Plenum Publishers.
- Colby, D.W.; P. Garg; G. Chao; J. Webster; A. Messer; V.M. Ingram; K.D. Wittrup (17 September 2004). "Development of a Human Variable Light Chain Domain Intracellular Antibody against Huntingtin via Yeast Surface Display". J. Mol. Biol. 342 (3): 901–12. doi:10.1016/j.jmb.2004.07.054. PMID 15342245.
- Webster, J.M.; D.W. Colby; V.M. Ingram; K.D. Wittrup; A. Messer (November 2004). "Enhanced anti-Huntington's Disease Intrabodies". Abstract Soc. Neurosci.
- Blanchard, B.J.; A. Chen; K. Stafford; P. Weigele; V.M. Ingram (5 October 2004). "Efficient reversal of Alzheimer's disease fibril formation and elimination of neurotoxicity by a small molecule". Proc Natl Acad Sci USA. 101 (40): 14326–32. Bibcode:2004PNAS..10114326B. doi:10.1073/pnas.0405941101. PMC 521943. PMID 15388848.

Inaugural Article: Efficient reversal of Alzheimer's disease fibril formation and elimination of neurotoxicity by a small molecule Barbara J. Blanchard, Albert Chen, Leslie M. Rozeboom, Kate A. Stafford, Peter Weigele, and Vernon M. Ingram PNAS 2004 101: 14326-14332

== See also ==
- MIT Biology Department
