= Ulrich Wolfgang Arndt =

Crystallographer

Ulrich Wolfgang Arndt FRS
- Born: 23 April 1924; Berlin
- Died: 24 March 2006 (aged 81); Cambridge
- Education: Emmanuel College, Cambridge
- Spouse: Valerie Howard Hilton-Sergeant
- Children: Elizabeth; Caroline; Annabel
- Scientific career
- Doctoral advisor: Henry Lipson

Ulrich Wolfgang Arndt FRS (23 April 1924 – 24 March 2006) was a scientist committed to the development of X-ray crystallography technology and instrumentation. His instruments were used to achieve data for some of the first solved protein structures, myoglobin and haemoglobin.

Born in Berlin, the family moved to Darmstadt in 1930, and Ulrich (always known as Uli) made good progress with his schooling despite the growing political unrest.

In 1936 his father appointed himself head of a British subsidiary of the company he worked for in Germany, and thus could move the family’s complete household to London.

After some coaching, Uli passed the entrance examination to Dulwich College. He attended Emmanuel College, Cambridge, beginning in 1942. He then gained a research position in the Department of Crystallography in the Cavendish Laboratory. He was awarded his PhD from Birmingham University with work on a Geiger counter spectrometer.

From Birmingham he moved to London in 1950 for a position in the Davy–Faraday Laboratory at the Royal Institution, where work began on protein structural determination. Sir Lawrence Bragg would become Director of the laboratory in 1954.

His work continued at Cambridge in 1962, when he joined the new MRC Laboratory of Molecular Biology, invited by Max Perutz.

He was elected Fellow of the Royal Society in 1982, and he received the British Crystallographic Association’s Dorothy Hodgkin Prize in 2000.

== Family life ==
Ulrich Arndt met Valerie Hilton-Sergeant on a skiing holiday in Lech, Austria in 1955. They married at Christ Church, Kensington on 29 July 1958. They have three children: Elizabeth, Caroline and Annabel.
