= Neuroproteomics =

Study of neurological proteins

Neuroproteomics is the study of the protein complexes and species that make up the nervous system. These proteins interact to make the neurons connect in such a way to create the intricacies that nervous system is known for. Neuroproteomics is a complex field that has a long way to go in terms of profiling the entire neuronal proteome. It is a relatively recent field that has many applications in therapy and science. So far, only small subsets of the neuronal proteome have been mapped, and then only when applied to the proteins involved in the synapse.

== History ==
=== Origins ===
The word proteomics was first used in 1994 by Marc Wilkins as the study of “the protein equivalent of a genome”. It is defined as all of the proteins expressed in a biological system under specific physiologic conditions at a certain point in time. It can change with any biochemical alteration, and so it can only be defined under certain conditions. Neuroproteomics is a subset of this field dealing with the complexities and multi-system origin of neurological disease. Neurological function is based on the interactions of many proteins of different origin, and so requires a systematic study of subsystems within its proteomic structure.

=== Modern times ===
Neuroproteomics has the difficult task of defining on a molecular level the pathways of consciousness, senses, and self. Neurological disorders are unique in that they do not always exhibit outward symptoms. Defining the disorders becomes difficult and so neuroproteomics is a step in the right direction of identifying bio-markers that can be used to detect diseases. Not only does the field have to map out the different proteins possible from the genome, but there are many modifications that happen after transcription that affect function as well. Because neurons are such dynamic structures, changing with every action potential that travels through them, neuroproteomics offers the most potential for mapping out the molecular template of their function. Genomics offers a static roadmap of the cell, while proteomics can offer a glimpse into structures smaller than the cell because of its specific nature to each moment in time.

== Mechanisms of Use ==
=== Protein Separation ===
In order for neuroproteomics to function correctly, proteins must be separated in terms of the proteome from which they came. For example, one set might be under normal conditions, while another might be under diseased conditions. Proteins are commonly separated using two-dimensional polyacrylamide gel electrophoresis (2D PAGE). For this technique, proteins are run across an immobile gel with a pH gradient until they stop at the point where their net charge is neutral. After separating by charge in one direction, sodium dodecyl sulfate is run in the other direction to separate the proteins by size. A two-dimensional map is created using this technique that can be used to match additional proteins later. One can usually match the function of a protein by identifying in an 2D PAGE in simple proteomics because many intracellular somatic pathways are known. In neuroproteomics, however, many proteins combine to give an end result that may be neurological disease or breakdown. It is necessary then to study each protein individually and find a correlation between the different proteins to determine the cause of a neurological disease. New techniques are being developed that can identify proteins once they are separated out using 2D PAGE.

=== Protein Identification ===
Protein separate techniques, such as 2D PAGE, are limited in that they cannot handle very high or low molecular weight protein species. Alternative methods have been developed to deal with such cases. These include liquid chromatography mass spectrometry along with sodium dodecyl sulfate polyacrylamide gel electrophoresis, or liquid chromatography mass spectrometry run in multiple dimensions. Compared to simple 2D page, liquid chromatography mass spectrometry can handle a larger range of protein species size, but it is limited in the amount of protein sample it handle at once. Liquid chromatography mass spectrometry is also limited in its lack of a reference map from which to work with. Complex algorithms are usually used to analyze the fringe results that occur after a procedure is run. The unknown portions of the protein species are usually not analyzed in favor of familiar proteomes, however. This fact reveals a fault with current technology; new techniques are needed to increase both the specificity and scope of proteome mapping.

== Applications ==
=== Drug Addiction ===
It is commonly known that drug addiction involves permanent synaptic plasticity of various neuronal circuits. Neuroproteomics is being applied to study the effect of drug addiction across the synapse. Research is being conducted by isolating distinct regions of the brain in which synaptic transmission takes place and defining the proteome for that particular region. Different stages of drug abuse must be studied, however, in order to map out the progression of protein changes along the course of the drug addiction. These stages include enticement, ingesting, withdrawal, addiction, and removal. It begins with the change in the genome through transcription that occurs due to the abuse of drugs. It continues to identify the most likely proteins to be affected by the drugs and focusing in on that area. For drug addiction, the synapse is the most likely target as it involves communication between neurons. Lack of sensory communication in neurons is often an outward sign of drug abuse, and so neuroproteomics is being applied to find out what proteins are being affected to prevent the transport of neurotransmitters. In particular, the vesicle releasing process is being studied to identify the proteins involved in the synapse during drug abuse. Proteins such as synaptotagmin and synaptobrevin interact to fuse the vesicle into the membrane. Phosphorylation also has its own set of proteins involved that work together to allow the synapse to function properly. Drugs such as morphine change properties such as cell adhesion, neurotransmitter volume, and synaptic traffic. After significant morphine application, tyrosine kinases received less phosphorylation and thus send fewer signals inside the cell. These receptor proteins are unable to initiate the intracellular signaling processes that enable the neuron to live, and necrosis or apoptosis may be the result. With more and more neurons affected along this chain of cell death, permanent loss of sensory or motor function may be the result. By identifying the proteins that are changed with drug abuse, neuroproteomics may give clinicians even earlier biomarkers to test for to prevent permanent neurological damage.

Recently, a novel terminology (Psychoproteomics) has been coined by the University of Florida researchers from Dr. Mark S Gold Lab. Kobeissy et al. defined Psychoproteomics as integral proteomics approach dedicated to studying proteomic changes in the field of psychiatric disorders, particularly substance-and drug-abuse neurotoxicity.

=== Brain Injury ===
Traumatic brain injury is defined as a “direct physical impact or trauma to the head followed by a dynamic series of injury and repair events”. Recently, neuroproteomics have been applied to studying the disability that over 5.4 million Americans live with. In addition to physically injuring the brain tissue, traumatic brain injury induces the release of glutamate that interacts with ionotropic glutamate receptors (iGluRs). These glutamate receptors acidify the surrounding intracranial fluid, causing further injury on the molecular level to nearby neurons. The death of the surrounding neurons is induced through normal apoptosis mechanisms, and it is this cycle that is being studied with neuroproteomics. Three different cysteine protease derivatives are involved in the apoptotic pathway induced by the acidic environment triggered by glutamate. These cysteine proteases include calpain, caspase, and cathepsin. These three proteins are examples of detectable signs of traumatic brain injury that are much more specific than temperature, oxygen level, or intracranial pressure. Proteomics thus also offers a tracking mechanism by which researchers can monitor the progression of traumatic brain injury, or a chronic disease such as Alzheimer’s or Parkinson’s. Especially in Parkinson’s, in which neurotransmitters play a large role, recent proteomic research has involved the study of synaptotagmin. Synaptotagmin is involved in the calcium-induced budding of vesicle containing neurotransmitters from the presynaptic membrane. By studying the intracellular mechanisms involved in neural apoptosis after traumatic brain injury, researchers can create a map that genetic changes can follow later on.

=== Nerve Growth ===
One group of researchers applied the field of neuroproteomics to examine how different proteins affect the initial growth of neuritis. The experiment compared the protein activity of control neurons with the activity of neurons treated with nerve growth factor (NGF) and JNJ460, an “immunophilin ligand.” JNJ460 is an offspring of another drug that is used to prevent immune attack when organs are transplanted. It is not an immunosuppressant, however, but rather it acts as a shield against microglia. NGF promotes neuron viability and differentiation by binding to TrkA, a tyrosine receptor kinase. This receptor is important in initiating intracellular metabolic pathways, including Ras, Rak, and MAP kinase.

Protein differentiation was measured in each cell sample with and without treatment by NGF and JNJ460. A peptide mixture was made by washing off unbound portions of the amino acid sequence in a reverse column. The resulting mixture was then suspended a peptide mixture in a bath of cation exchange fluid. The proteins were identified by splicing them with trypsin and then searching through the results of passing the product through a mass spectrometer. This applies a form of liquid chromatography mass spectrometry to identify proteins in the mixture

JNJ460 treatment resulted in an increase in “signal transduction” proteins, while NGF resulted in an increase in proteins associated with the ribosome and synthesis of other proteins. JNJ460 also resulted in more structural proteins associated with intercellular growth, such as actin, myosin, and troponin. With NGF treatment, cells increased protein synthesis and creation of ribosomes. This method allows the analysis of all of the protein patterns overall, rather than a single change in an amino acid. Western blots confirmed the results, according to the researchers, though the changes in proteins were not as obvious in their protocol.

The main significance to these findings are that JNJ460 are NGF are distinct processes that both control the protein output of the cell. JNJ460 resulted in increased neuronal size and stability while NGF resulted in increased membrane proteins. When combined, they significantly increase a neuron’s chance of growth. While JNJ460 may “prime” some parts of the cell for NGF treatment, they do not work together. JNJ460 is thought to interact with Schwann cells in regenerating actin and myosin, which are key players in axonal growth. NGF helps the neuron grow as a whole. These two proteins do not play a part in communication with other neurons, however. They merely increase the size of the membrane down which a signal can be sent. Other neurotrophic factor proteomes are needed to guide neurons to each other to create synapses.

== Limitations ==
The broad scope of the available raw neuronal proteins to map requires that initial studies be focused on small areas of the neurons. When taking samples, there are a few places that interest neurologists most. The most important place to start for neurologists is the plasma membrane. This is where most of the communication between neurons takes place. The proteins being mapped here include ion channels, neurotransmitter receptors, and molecule transporters. Along the plasma membrane, the proteins involved in creating cholesterol-rich lipid rafts are being studied because they have been shown to be crucial for glutamate uptake during the initial stages of neuron formation. As mentioned before, vesicle proteins are also being studied closely because they are involved in disease. Collecting samples to study, however, requires special consideration to ensure that the reproducibility of the samples is not compromised. When taking a global sample of one area of the brain for example, proteins that are ubiquitous and relatively unimportant show up very clear in the SDS PAGE. Other unexplored, more specific proteins barely show up and are therefore ignored. It is usually necessary to divide up the plasma membrane proteome, for example, into subproteomes characterized by specific function. This allows these more specific classes of peptides to show up more clearly. In a way, dividing into subproteomes is simply applying a magnifying lens to a specific section of a global proteome’s SDS PAGE map. This method seems to be most effective when applied to each cellular organelle separately. Mitochondrial proteins, for example, which are more effective at transporting electrons across its membrane, can be specifically targeted effectively in order to match their electron-transporting ability to their amino acid sequence.

== Bibliography ==
- Alzate O. "Neuroproteomics." Frontiers in Neuroscience Series (October 2010) C.R.C. Press. ISBN 978-1-4200-7625-7
- Abul-Husn, Noura S., Lakshmi A. Devi. "Neuroproteomics of the Synapse and Drug Addiction." The Journal of Pharmacology and Experimental Therapeutics 138 (2006): 461-468.
- Becker, Michael, Jens Schindler, Hans G. Nothwang. "Neuroproteomics - the Tasks Lying Ahead." Electrophoresis 27 (2006): 2819-2829.
- Butcher, James. "Neuroproteomics Comes of Age." The Lancet Neurology 6 (2007): 851-852.
- Kim, Sandra I., Hans Voshol, Jan van Oostrum, Terri G. Hastings, Michael Casico, Marc J. Glucksmann. “Neuroproteomics: Expression Profiling of the Brain’s Proteomes in Health and Disease.” Neurochemical Research 29 (2004): 1317-1331
- Kobeissy, Firas H., Andrew K. Ottens, Zhiqun Zhang, Ming Cheng Liu, Nancy D. Denslow, Jitendra R. Dave, Frank C. Tortella, Ronald L. Hayes, Kevin K. Wang. "Novel Differential Neuroproteomics Analysis of Traumatic Brain Injury in Rats." Molecular & Cellular Proteomics 5 (2006): 1887-1898.
- Liu, Tong, Veera D'mello, Longwen Deng, Jun Hu, Michael Ricardo, Sanqiang Pan, Xiaodong Lu, Scott Wadsworth, John Siekierka, Raymond Birge, Hong Li. "A Multiplexed Proteomics Approach to Differentiate Neurite Outgrowth Patterns." Journal of Neuroscience Methods 158 (2006): 22-29.
- Ottens, Andrew K., Firas H. Kobeissy, Erin C. Golden, Zhiqun Zhang, William E. Haskins, Su-Shing Chen, Ronald L. Hayes, Kevin K. Wang, Nancy D. Denslow. "Neuroproteomics in Neurotrauma." Mass Spectrometry Reviews 25 (2006): 380-406.
- Ottens, Andrew K. "The methodology of neuroproteomics." Methods Mol Biol. (2009) 566:1-21.
- Southey, Bruce R., Andinet Amare, Tyler A. Zimmerman, Sandra L. Rodriguez, Jonathan V. Sweedler. "NeuroPred: a Tool to Predict Cleavage Sites in Neuropeptide Precursors and Provide the Masses of the Resulting Peptides." Nucleic Acids Research 34 (2006): 267-272.
- Tribl, F, K Marcus, G Bringmann, H.E. Meyer, M Gerlach, P Riederer. "Proteomics of the Human Brain: Sub-Proteomes Might Hold the Key to Handle Brain Complexity." Journal of Neural Transmission 113 (2006): 1041-1054.
- Williams, Kenneth, Terence Wu, Christopher Colangelo, Angus C. Nairn. "Recent Advances in Neuroproteomics and Potential Application to Studies of Drug Addiction." Neuropharmacology 47 (2004): 148-166.
- Kobeissy, Firas H., Sadasivan S, Liu J, Mark S Gold, Kevin K. Wang. "Psychiatric research: psychoproteomics, degradomics and systems biology." Expert Rev Proteomics 5 (2008): 293-314.
