= Complex cell =

Brain cell involved in visual processing

Complex cells can be found in the primary visual cortex (V1), the secondary visual cortex (V2), and Brodmann area 19 (V3).

Like a simple cell, a complex cell will respond primarily to oriented edges and gratings, however it has a degree of spatial invariance. This means that its receptive field cannot be mapped into fixed excitatory and inhibitory zones. Rather, it will respond to patterns of light in a certain orientation within a large receptive field, regardless of the exact location. Some complex cells respond optimally only to movement in a certain direction.

These cells were discovered by Torsten Wiesel and David Hubel in the early 1960s. They refrained from reporting on the complex cells in (Hubel 1959) because they did not feel that they understood them well enough at the time. In Hubel and Wiesel (1962), they reported that complex cells were intermixed with simple cells and when excitatory and inhibitory regions could be established, the summation and mutual antagonism properties didn't hold.

The difference between the receptive fields and the characteristics of simple and complex cells is the hierarchical convergent nature of visual processing. Complex cells receive inputs from a number of simple cells. Their receptive field is therefore a summation and integration of the receptive fields of many input simple cells, although some input is directly received from the LGN. The manner through which simple cells are able to make up complex cells is not fully understood. A simple addition of receptive fields would result in complex cells manifesting observable, separate excitatory/inhibitory regions, which is not the case.

== Discovery ==
The discovery of the complex cells in visual cortex began with experiments on a cat. Kuffler first shone small spots of light on a cat's retina. With this, he was able to conclude that ganglion cells have concentric (active at high light levels) receptive fields. These cells also have either an on-center receptive field (excited when the stimulus is presented directly on the center of the receptive field) or off-center receptive field (excited when the stimulus is presented off the center of the receptive field). Later, Hubel and Wiesel began their own experiments on cats to further solidify the knowledge on the visual receptive fields. One experiment recorded from anesthetized cats; these cats were paralyzed to stabilize their eyes. The cat then faced a screen where various patterns of white light were shone. Each cell's receptive fields were mapped for both eyes on sheets of paper.

Other studies of complex cells have been performed by Movshon et al., Emerson et al., Touryan et al. and Rust et al.

== Simple vs. Complex Cells and Receptive Fields ==
With simple cells and simple receptive fields, the cells in visual cortex could respond in a way that can be noted from arrangements of excitatory and inhibitory regions in their receptive fields. What this means, essentially, is that the receptive fields are "simple" because there appears to be a relationship between the response of the cell and the receptive field mapped with small spots. Complex cells and complex receptive fields, on the other hand have a more complex response that does not exhibit that relationship. The results from the above experiment determined that simple fields have clear excitatory and inhibitory divisions, where light shone on an excitatory region increases the firing of a cell and light shone on an inhibitory region decreased firing of a cell. There is also evidence of summation properties, such as light shone across a larger region of either division resulted in a greater change in firing rate than light shone across a smaller region. It is also important to note that excitatory regions can inhibit inhibitory regions and vice versa, as well as it is possible to predict responses of the cells from a map of these areas.

On the contrary, complex cells and complex receptive fields are defined to be "not simple." These cell's response to a stimulus cannot be predicted as simple cells can, as they have no inhibitory and excitatory areas. Summation and the inhibition idea also do not often hold. For example, a horizontal slit was presented in the experiment, and it was found that a cell responded highly to this slit. On these complex cells, as long as the slit was horizontal, it did not matter where the slit was positioned on the receptive field. With simple cells, it would be expected that there would be a higher response to a wide slit. However, the opposite effect occurred: the firing of the cell actually decreased. It was also tested for orientation of the slit. For simple cells, it would be expected that as long as the slit covers the excitatory field, the orientation should not matter. Again, the opposite occurred where even slight tilts to the slit resulted in decreased response.

== Modeling Complex Cells ==
From various studies, including Movshon et al. in 1978 and even as early as the 1960s, simple cells have been able to be modeled with a linear model. This would indicate that these simple cells undergo processes that calculate weighted sums of stimulus intensities where the weights are found from the receptive field. This stems from research by Enroth-Cugell & Robson in 1966 which modeled ganglion cells similar to P cells in primates (X cells) and ganglion cells similar to M cells in primates (Y cells). Complex cells, on the other hand, are more complex and fall under a different model. Rather, it was noted that these cells perform nonlinear operations, which suggested that they have linear receptive fields, but instead sum a distorted output of subunits. It was found that complex cells shared similarities to Y cells, making this subunit model a promising candidate to model complex cells.

Movshon et al. in 1978 tested responses from simple cells to determine if the simple model for the X cells was a good fit. They later applied the same testing to complex cells, but used the Y cell (subunit) model instead. This model stated that each subunits could respond differently, but the converted responses would be offset in time, so it would sum to a constant value. It also stated that the response of the cells could not be predicted from the receptive field on its own. Complex cells appeared to match the subunit model, but still lacked the restriction that the receptive fields are linear. This was also tested by measuring the response of a cell when the stimulus contains two bars, which would help show the properties of the receptive field subunit. What they found was that by knowing these properties of the subunits, it was possible to predict spatial frequency selectivity, as was the case for simple cells. Hence, complex cells could be modeled by the subunit model used for Y ganglion cells.

Other computational models of complex cells have been proposed by Adelson and Bergen, Heeger, Serre and Riesenhuber, Einhäuser et al., Kording et al., Merolla and Boahen, Berkes and Wiscott, Carandini, Hansard and Horaud and Lindeberg.
