= Glenn A. Fry =

American scientist (1908–1996)

Glenn Ansel Fry (September 10, 1908 – January 5, 1996) was an American scientist who studied physiological optics and optometry.

== Life and work ==
Fry was born in Wellford, South Carolina. His parents were Sebastian R. Fry and Amy Brown. Fry completed a Bachelor's degree at Davidson College, North Carolina in 1929 and a PhD in Psychology (supervised by William McDougall) from Duke University in 1933.

In 1933, Fry became a National Research Council Fellow at the Washington University School of Medicine Department of Ophthalmology. In 1935, Fry was appointed as an assistant professor in the department of physics at Ohio State University in Columbus. With the support of the Professor of Physics, Fry established a graduate course in physiological optics. In 1937, he established a School of Optometry and became its director.

In 1949, Fry became co-director of the Institute of Research in Vision at the university. In 1963, he succeeded in starting a course leading to a Doctor of Optometry degree. Fry became a full professor in 1966.

Prior to 1935, Fry married Martha Ray. They had three children.

== Research ==
Fry's earliest paper in on color vision.

== Awards ==
- 1954 Foundation Lecturer of the British Optical Association
- 1954 Beverly Myers Achievement Award of the American Board of Opticianty
- 1961 The Tillyer Medal of the Optical Society of America
- 1964 The Apollo Award of the American Academy of Optometry
- 1969 The Gold Medal of the Illuminating Engineering Society
- 1969 Honorary Doctor of Science from LMU Munich
- 1970 Honorary Doctor of Science from Pennsylvania College of Optometry

== Honors ==
Prior to 1987, the College of Optometry at Ohio State founded the Glenn A. Fry Medal in Physiological Optics.
