= Dragana Rogulja =

Serbian neuroscientist

- Born: Belgrade, Serbia
- Education: Rutgers University
- Known for: Morphogenic gradients in wing development, CycA regulation of sleep in Drosophila
- Awards: 2016 NIH Director's New Innovator Award Recipient, 2016 Pew Biomedical Scholar, 2015 NYSCF – Robertson Neuroscience Investigator
- Scientific career
- Fields: Neuroscience
- Workplaces: Harvard Medical School

Dragana Rogulja is a Serbian neuroscientist and circadian biologist who is an assistant professor in Neurobiology within the Harvard Medical School Blavatnik Institute of Neurobiology. Rogulja explores the molecular mechanisms governing sleep in Drosophila as well as probing how circadian mechanisms integrate sensory information to drive behavior. Rogulja uses mating behavior in Drosophila to explore the neural circuits linking internal states to motivated behaviors.

== Early life and education ==
Rogulja was born in Belgrade, Serbia. She pursued an undergraduate education in pharmacy at the University of Belgrade, but was driven to study abroad due to the economic situation in Belgrade. In 1998, midway through her undergraduate degree, Rogulja moved to the United States and finished her undergraduate degree at Rutgers University. She joined the lab of Konstantin Severinov, a Russian molecular biologist, where she worked as an undergraduate researcher and was able to conduct experiments that lead to publications in Science, the Journal of Biological Chemistry, and the Journal of Molecular Biology. Rogulja explored the interactions between the alpha and beta subunits of eukaryotic RNA polymerase in its assembly intermediate state.

Rogulja stayed at Rutgers University to pursue her graduate training in 2000. She joined the lab of Kenneth D. Irvine to study intercellular signalling and regulation of tissue growth by morphogen gradients in drosophila. Rogulja pursued her postdoctoral training under Michael W. Young at Rockefeller University in New York City. Under Young's mentorship, Rogulja began to explore circadian biology and the neural mechanisms regulating sleep in drosophila. She completed her postdoctoral training in 2012.

In her graduate work, Rogulja explored how morphogenic gradients control growth in development. In her first author paper published in Cell in 2005, Rogulja showed, for the first time, that the regulation of wing growth in Drosophila is governed by the morphogenic gradient of Decapentaplegic (DPP). One question that spurred their project was how the wings of Drosophila could have even growth driven by a morphogenic gradient. Going with the hypothesis that slope of the DPP gradient, rather than absolute levels, drives consistent and even growth, Rogulja created a method for controlled gene expression where she could show that signalling between neighboring cells exposed to DPP gradients drives proliferation. Rogulja further proposed a model to explain the morphogen slope dependency on growth, highlighting importantly that her model could account for normal growth despite local variations in morphogen concentration.

Rogulja continued to use Drosophila as a model organism in her postdoctoral studies, but this time to ask question about the molecular mechanisms of sleep. Rogulja found that cyclin A (CycA) and its regulator cyclin A1 promote sleep in Drosophila. Fascinatingly, CycA is only expressed in 40-50 neurons in the fly brain, intermingled with circadian clock neurons suggesting that interactions with their cellular neighbors are important in allowing the circadian cycle to influence sleep. When Rogulja artificially reduced expression of CycA in these neurons, she found that Drosophila had hard times falling asleep and reduced responses to sleep deprivation. Further, since CycA is a cell cycle regulator that is highly conserved across species, Rogulja and her colleagues propose the importance of CycA in sleep regulation beyond drosophila. In a later paper, Rogulja and a team of researchers used a forward genetic screen to isolate another regulator of CycA called TARA. They found that TARA interacts with CycA to promote sleep and that it acts through inhibiting Cdk1 in the arousal center of the fly brain.

== Career and research ==
In 2013, Rogulja was recruited to Harvard Medical School to become an assistant professor in the Department of Neurobiology. As the principal investigator of the Ragoluja Lab, Rogulja runs a research program with three main focuses: sleep, circadian biology, and motivation. Rogulja uses both Drosophila and rodent models to answer her questions on these topics. Her lab explores the biological basis of sleep from the neural circuits underlying sleep behavior to how sleep deprivation impacts sensory processes such as pain perception. In relation to this work, Rogulja explores how sensory information guides the circadian clock to drive specific behaviors at certain times of day. Lastly, Rogulja collaborates extensively with the Crickmore Lab, led by Michael Crickmore at Harvard, to explore motivated states that drive behavior in animal models, with a specific focus on how sexual behavior is calibrated by internal states. In 2016, Rogulja gave a TEDX Talk in Boston describing the importance of basic science research to understand fundamental mechanisms governing sleep and how our increased exposure to light and dysregulated sleep-wake schedules due to globalization and travel affect our biology.

One facet of Rogulja's lab explores the neural mechanisms governing mating behavior in drosophila. In 2016, Rogulja and her colleagues discovered the role of dopamine in reflecting the mating need state in males flies and driving the appropriate reproductive behaviors. They found that as males flies participated in copulations, they had increased dopaminergic activity, and decreased mating driving, highlighting the potential of dopamine activity serving as a molecular correlate of mating drive. They further found that the mating drive signal is transmitted by dopamine neurons and integrated with sensory information specific to female perceptions and these neurons further project to motor areas to drive mating behavior. Their circuit mapping exquisitely shows the way in which internal motivational states in drosophila can interact with sensory information and change behavioral output. Following this study, Rogulja and her colleagues explored how dopaminergic signals onto P1 neurons determine courtship probability. They found that a motivational dopamine signal drives the initiation of courtship behavior through interactions with P1 neurons, and the same dopamine signal arriving at P1 following initiation of copulation helps to sustain copulation as well as terminate it. The mechanisms with which the dopaminergic neurons stimulate and terminate copulatory behavior are distinct and the element of chance in plays a role in behavioral outcomes due to the desensitization mechanisms of dopamine neurons pre-copulation. While the element of chance might lead to behavioral inflexibility by the organism itself, it also allows for environmental influences to shape outcomes in novel ways.

Again using mating behavior as a tool to elucidate neural correlates of motivational states, Rogulja and her team probed how motivational dynamics can exist across such large time scales. They identified an excitation loop in Drosophila wherein increased dopaminergic tone increased the propensity to court but then after copulation, CREB2 generates an inhibitory environment by increasing expression of leaky potassium channels, which helps to stabilize peak motivation in reproductive drive and induce reproductive satiety. They further used computational tools to reproducibly model the observed behavioral and physiological dynamics in mating behavior.

== Awards and honors ==
- 2016 NIH Director's New Innovator Award Recipient
- 2016 Pew Biomedical Scholar
- 2015 NYSCF – Robertson Neuroscience Investigator

== Select publications ==
- Zhang SX, Rogulja D, Crickmore MA. Recurrent Circuitry Sustains Drosophila Courtship Drive While Priming Itself for Satiety. 2019. Current Biology : Cb. PMID 31474539
- Zhang SX, Miner LE, Boutros CL, Rogulja D, Crickmore MA. Motivation, Perception, and Chance Converge to Make a Binary Decision. Neuron. PMID 29983326 DOI: 10.1016/j.neuron.2018.06.014
- Zhang SX, Rogulja D, Crickmore MA. Dopaminergic Circuitry Underlying Mating Drive. Neuron. 2016. PMID 27292538
- Rogulja D, Young MW. Control of sleep by cyclin A and its regulator. 2012. Science. 335: 1617–21. PMID 22461610
- Rogulja D, Rauskolb C, Irvine KD. Morphogen control of wing growth through the Fat signaling pathway. 2008. Developmental Cell. 15: 309–21. PMID 18694569
- Rogulja D, Irvine KD. Regulation of cell proliferation by a morphogen gradient. 2005. Cell. 123: 449–61. PMID 16269336 DOI: 10.1016/j.cell.2005.08.030
- Kuznedelov K, Minakhin L, Niedziela-Majka A, Dove SL, Rogulja D, Nickels BE, Hochschild A, Heyduk T, Severinov K. A role for interaction of the RNA polymerase flap domain with the sigma subunit in promoter recognition. Science. 295: 855–7.
