= Andrew Lumsden (scientist) =

British neuroscientist

Andrew Lumsden FRS FMedSci
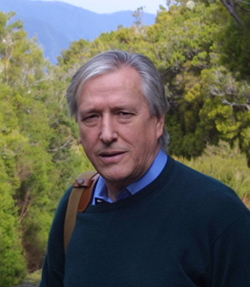
- Andrew Lumsden
- Born: Andrew Gino Sita-Lumsden; 22 January 1947 (age 79)
- Education: Kingswood School
- Alma mater: University of Cambridge (BA); Yale University; University of London (PhD)
- Awards: Ferrier Lecture (2001)
- Scientific career
- Fields: Neurobiology
- Workplaces: King's College London; Guy's Hospital; University of California, Berkeley
- Website: www.kcl.ac.uk/ioppn/depts/devneuro/Research/groups/lumsden.aspx

Andrew Gino Lumsden (born 22 January 1947) is an English neurobiologist, Emeritus Professor of the University of London and founder in 2000 of the Medical Research Council Centre for Developmental Neurobiology at King's College London.

== Education ==
Andrew Lumsden attended Kingswood School in Bath, Somerset (as Andrew Sita-Lumsden) and graduated from St. Catharine's College, Cambridge with Double First Class Honours in Natural Sciences. After visiting Yale University for two years as a Fulbright Scholar, he returned to England to complete his PhD in Developmental Biology at the University of London.

== Career and research ==
Lumsden has held various lectureships at Guy's Hospital Medical School and the United Medical Schools of Guy's and St. Thomas' Hospital before being made a full Professor of the University of London in 1989. He has been an International Scholar of the Howard Hughes Medical Institute (1993–1998) and a Miller Institute visiting professor at the University of California, Berkeley (1994).

Lumsden has served on the Medical Research Council Neurosciences and Mental Health Board and Grants Committee (1992—1998), the Wellcome Trust Neuroscience Funding Committee (1997—2000), and the Brain Functions Grant Review Committee of the Human Frontier Science Program (1998—2001). He has also served as editor of Development (1995—2007) and is co-founder of the on-line, open-access journal Neural Development. In addition, Andrew Lumsden is a co-Head of Section for Faculty of 1000.

Andrew Lumsden has co-authored a book entitled The Developing Brain with Michael Brown and Roger Keynes. Following his PhD on epithelial-mesenchymal interactions in mammalian development, Lumsden's interest moved to the question of how integumental structures, such as teeth and vibrissae acquire their nerve supply, and how the cranial neural crest contributes to their patterning. Studies on the development of the trigeminal nerve and ganglion led on to observations of the organisation of their corresponding motor and sensory regions of the central nervous system. His seminal observations and experiments on the developing hindbrain of mammal and bird embryos confirmed the long suggested but never agreed view that this brain region has a rigidly segmented organisation, much like the body plan of insects and worms. To assist his research, he developed the Lumsden BioScissors™. Most recently, he has focussed on the developing forebrain, where he discovered signalling properties in a small set of cells that pattern the large surrounding region of the thalamus.

=== Awards and honours ===
Lumsden was elected a Fellow of the Royal Society (elected 1994), a Fellow of the Academy of Medical Sciences (1998), and a Fellow of King's College London (1999). He was also elected an EMBO Member in 2008.

In 2001, he was awarded The Ferrier Lecture and medal by the Royal Society and in 2007, the W. Maxwell Cowan Prize for "outstanding contributions in developmental neuroscience".

Lumsden has also been elected Freeman of the Worshipful Company of Clockmakers in 2006, and raised to the Livery in 2016.

=== Publications ===
Lumsden's publications include:

- Lumsden AG, Davies AM (1983). "Earliest sensory nerve fibres are guided to peripheral targets by attractants other than nerve growth factor". Nature. 306 (5945): 786–8. Bibcode:1983Natur.306..786L. doi:10.1038/306786a0. PMID 6656880. S2CID 4317445.
- Lumsden AG, Davies AM (1986). "Chemotropic effect of specific target epithelium in the developing mammalian nervous system". Nature. 323 (6088): 538–9. Bibcode:1986Natur.323..538L. doi:10.1038/323538a0. PMID 3762707. S2CID 4363988.
- Tessier-Lavigne M, Placzek M, Lumsden AG, Dodd J, Jessell TM (1988). "Chemotropic guidance of developing axons in the mammalian central nervous system". Nature. 336 (6201): 775–8. Bibcode:1988Natur.336..775T. doi:10.1038/336775a0. PMID 3205306. S2CID 4247407.
- Lumsden A (March 1989). "Multipotent cells in the avian neural crest". Trends Neurosci. 12 (3): 81–3. doi:10.1016/0166-2236(89)90159-8. PMID 2469219. S2CID 31991456.
- Lumsden A, Keynes R (February 1989). "Segmental patterns of neuronal development in the chick hindbrain". Nature. 337 (6206): 424–8. Bibcode:1989Natur.337..424L. doi:10.1038/337424a0. PMID 2644541. S2CID 4262186.
- Heffner CD, Lumsden AG, O'Leary DD (January 1990). "Target control of collateral extension and directional axon growth in the mammalian brain". Science. 247 (4939): 217–20. Bibcode:1990Sci...247..217H. doi:10.1126/science.2294603. PMID 2294603.
- Fraser S, Keynes R, Lumsden A (March 1990). "Segmentation in the chick embryo hindbrain is defined by cell lineage restrictions". Nature. 344 (6265): 431–5. Bibcode:1990Natur.344..431F. doi:10.1038/344431a0. PMID 2320110. S2CID 4355552.
- Lumsden A (August 1990). "The cellular basis of segmentation in the developing hindbrain". Trends Neurosci. 13 (8): 329–35. doi:10.1016/0166-2236(90)90144-Y. PMID 1699318. S2CID 3997227.
- Lumsden A, Sprawson N, Graham A (December 1991). "Segmental origin and migration of neural crest cells in the hindbrain region of the chick embryo". Development. 113 (4): 1281–91. doi:10.1242/dev.113.4.1281. PMID 1811942.
- Guthrie S, Muchamore I, Kuroiwa A, Marshall H, Krumlauf R, Lumsden A (March 1992). "Neuroectodermal autonomy of Hox-2.9 expression revealed by rhombomere transpositions". Nature. 356 (6365): 157–9. Bibcode:1992Natur.356..157G. doi:10.1038/356157a0. PMID 1545869. S2CID 4346647.
- Simon H, Lumsden A (August 1993). "Rhombomere-specific origin of the contralateral vestibulo-acoustic efferent neurons and their migration across the embryonic midline". Neuron. 11 (2): 209–20. doi:10.1016/0896-6273(93)90179-U. PMID 8394719. S2CID 35121927.
- Lumsden A, Clarke JD, Keynes R, Fraser S (June 1994). "Early phenotypic choices by neuronal precursors, revealed by clonal analysis of the chick embryo hindbrain". Development. 120 (6): 1581–9. doi:10.1242/dev.120.6.1581. PMID 8050364.
- Graham A, Francis-West P, Brickell P, Lumsden A (December 1994). "The signalling molecule BMP4 mediates apoptosis in the rhombencephalic neural crest". Nature. 372 (6507): 684–6. Bibcode:1994Natur.372..684G. doi:10.1038/372684a0. PMID 7990961. S2CID 4361935.
- Logan C, Wizenmann A, Drescher U, Monschau B, Bonhoeffer F, Lumsden A (1996). "Rostral optic tectum adopts a caudal phenotype following ectopic Engrailed expression". Current Biology. 6 (8): 1006–1014. doi:10.1016/S0960-9822(02)00645-0. PMID 8805331. S2CID 15159391.
- Lumsden A, Krumlauf R (1996). "Patterning the vertebrate neuraxis". Science. 274 (5290): 1109–1115. Bibcode:1996Sci...274.1109L. doi:10.1126/science.274.5290.1109. PMID 8895453. S2CID 10891464.
- Studer M, Lumsden A, Ariza-McNaughton L, Bradley A, Krumlauf R (1996). "Altered segmental identity and abnormal migration of motor neurons in mice lacking Hoxb-1". Nature. 384 (6610): 630–634. Bibcode:1996Natur.384..630S. doi:10.1038/384630a0. PMID 8967950. S2CID 4317559.
- Bell E, Wingate, R. Lumsden A. (1999). "Homeotic transformation of rhombomere identity following localised Hoxb1 misexpression". Science. 284 (5423): 2168–2171. doi:10.1126/science.284.5423.2168. PMID 10381880.
- Fortin G, Jungbluth S, Lumsden A, Champagnat J (1999). "Segmental specification of GABAergic inhibition during development of hindbrain neural networks" (PDF). Nature Neuroscience. 2 (10): 873–877. doi:10.1038/13172. PMID 10491606. S2CID 27168904.
- Zeltser L, Larsen C, Lumsden A (2001). "A new developmental compartment in the forebrain regulated by Lunatic fringe". Nature Neuroscience. 4 (7): 683–684. doi:10.1038/89455. PMID 11426219. S2CID 26205097.
- Larsen C, Zeltser L, Lumsden A (2001). "Boundary formation and compartition in the avian diencephalon". Journal of Neuroscience. 21 (13): 4699–4711. doi:10.1523/jneurosci.21-13-04699.2001. PMC 6762343. PMID 11425897.
- Matsumoto K, Nishihara S, Kamimura M, Shiraishi T, Otoguro T, Uehara M, Maeda Y, Ogura K, Lumsden A, Ogura T (2004). "The prepattern transcription factor Irx2, a target of the FGF8/MAP kinase cascade, is involved in cerebellum formation". Nature Neuroscience. 7 (6): 605–612. doi:10.1038/nn1249. PMID 15133517. S2CID 23807922.
- Kiecker C, Lumsden A (2004). "Hedgehog signalling from the zona limitans intrathalamica regulates the emergence of thalamic and prethalamic identity". Nature Neuroscience. 7 (11): 1242–1249. doi:10.1038/nn1338. PMID 15494730. S2CID 29863625.
- Kiecker C, Lumsden A (2005). "Compartments and their boundaries in vertebrate brain development". Nature Reviews Neuroscience. 6 (7): 553–564. doi:10.1038/nrn1702. PMID 15959467. S2CID 10869618.
- Scholpp S, Delogu A, Gilthorpe J, Peukert D, Lumsden A (2009). "Her6 regulates the neurogenetic gradient and neuronal identity in the thalamus". Proceedings of the National Academy of Sciences of the United States of America. 106 (47): 19895–19900. Bibcode:2009PNAS..10619895S. doi:10.1073/pnas.0910894106. PMC 2775703. PMID 19903880.
- Scholpp S, Lumsden A (2010). "Building a bridal chamber: development of the thalamus". Trends in Neurosciences. 33 (8): 373–380. doi:10.1016/j.tins.2010.05.003. PMC 2954313. PMID 20541814.
- Delogu A, Sellers K, Zagoraiou L, Bocianowska-Zbrog A, Mandal S, Guimera J, Rubenstein JL, Sugden D, Jessell T, Lumsden A (2012). "Subcortical visual shell nuclei targeted by ipRGCs develop from a Sox14+-GABAergic progenitor and require Sox14 to regulate daily activity rhythms". Neuron. 75 (4): 648–662. doi:10.1016/j.neuron.2012.06.013. PMID 22920256.
- Gilthorpe JD, Oozeer F, Nash J, Calvo M, Bennett DL, Lumsden A, Pini A (2013). "Extracellular histone H1 is neurotoxic and drives a pro-inflammatory response in microglia". F1000Research. 2: 148. doi:10.12688/f1000research.2-148.v1. PMC 3782347. PMID 24358859.
