= Christina Enroth-Cugell =

Vision scientist

Christina Alma Elisabeth Enroth-Cugell (1919 – June 15, 2016), was a vision scientist and professor at Northwestern University for over three decades. She was a founding faculty member and one of the first women to teach at the McCormick School of Engineering and chaired the Department of Neurobiology at the Weinberg College of Arts and Sciences from 1984 to 1986. She was also one of the first female interns at Passavant Memorial Hospital. Her husband David Cugell was a professor at the Feinberg School of Medicine for 58 years, the longest tenure in the school's history.

== Biography ==
She earned a joint M.D./Ph.D. from the Karolinska Institute in Stockholm under Nobel laureate Ragnar Granit and later completed postdoctoral work at both Karolinska and Harvard University, where she worked with physiologist Alexander Forbes.

She joined Northwestern University in 1955 as a research fellow and instructor in ophthalmology and became an assistant professor of physiology in 1962. In 1968, she transitioned to a joint appointment between engineering and neurobiology on the Evanston campus, helping shape interdisciplinary research in vision science. Her laboratory became a major international hub for vision research, training numerous prominent scientists in the field. She received the Friedenwald Award from the Association for Research in Vision and Ophthalmology, and the inaugural von Sallmann Prize from the International Congress of Eye Research. She was an elected Fellow of the American Academy of Arts and Sciences and the American Institute for Medical and Biological Engineering, and she served on the National Advisory Eye Council of the National Institutes of Health.

Enroth-Cugell remained scientifically active even after her retirement in 1990 and was widely recognized as both a rigorous scientist and a dedicated mentor.

Her husband, David Cugell, was a long-serving professor at the Northwestern University Feinberg School of Medicine and together they endowed a graduate fellowship.

== Research ==
Christina Enroth-Cugell's research made foundational contributions to visual neuroscience by applying quantitative systems analysis to the physiology of the mammalian retina and visual pathways. Her work bridged neurophysiology and biomedical engineering, helping establish a mathematical framework for understanding visual processing.

=== Retinal Ganglion Cells and Parallel Pathways ===
In her landmark collaboration with John G. Robson, Enroth-Cugell identified two distinct classes of retinal ganglion cells in the cat: X-cells, which exhibit approximately linear spatial summation, and Y-cells, which display highly non-linear summation. Y-cells show nonlinear responses to high spatial frequency or contrast-reversing gratings, in contrast to the more linear responses of X-cells.

Their 1966 paper was one of the first to apply systems analysis methods to visual neuroscience and has been cited more than 2,200 times as of 2026. In addition to defining X and Y cells, the study demonstrated that receptive fields could be quantitatively modeled as the difference of two Gaussian functions, describing center–surround interactions.

This work represented a major breakthrough in retinal neuroscience and helped establish the study of parallel processing pathways in the visual system.

=== Spatial Frequency Selectivity in Visual Cortex ===
Enroth-Cugell extended her work to the visual cortex using microelectrode recordings from single neurons in the cat's visual system. She showed that both cortical neurons and geniculate inputs are selectively tuned to narrow bands of spatial frequency when stimulated with moving grating patterns, with preferred frequencies spanning several octaves (approximately 0.18 to 3.8 cycles per degree). Cortical neurons additionally exhibited strong dependence on stimulus orientation, whereas geniculate responses were largely orientation-independent.

This work provided direct physiological evidence that vision is mediated by multiple channels, each sensitive to a limited range of spatial detail, linking neural responses to earlier psychophysical theories of spatial frequency processing.

=== Orientation and Angular Selectivity ===
Her work on cortical neurons helped establish quantitative measures of orientation selectivity using microelectrode recordings in the cat visual cortex. She showed that neuronal responses peak at a preferred orientation and decline approximately linearly as the stimulus angle deviates from this optimum. Most neurons exhibited relatively narrow tuning, with angular selectivity typically ranging between 14° and 26°, and many responded symmetrically to opposite directions of motion (180° apart). Preferred orientations were distributed broadly rather than biased toward vertical or horizontal angles, indicating a uniform representation of orientation.

This work provided physiological evidence for feature-specific processing in vision and highlighted differences between cortical response properties in cats and those reported in primates and humans.

=== Retinal Adaptation and Gain Control ===
Enroth-Cugell made significant contributions to understanding visual adaptation, particularly the mechanisms of gain control in retinal ganglion cells. She showed that the impulse/quantum (I/Q) ratio, a measure of response gain, remains stable at low background illumination but decreases sharply beyond a transition point as light levels increase, with resetting occurring within approximately 100 milliseconds of light onset.

Her research demonstrated that adaptation alters both the temporal dynamics and frequency response of retinal ganglion cells, shifting responses from sustained to transient and from low-pass to band-pass characteristics.

These findings were explained through a nonlinear feedback model involving horizontal cells, contributing to a broader understanding of retinal gain control mechanisms. Later work further described adaptation as a hierarchical process regulating contrast sensitivity across the visual system.

== Overall Contributions ==
Across her career, Enroth-Cugell pioneered the use of quantitative modeling, Fourier analysis, and systems theory in neuroscience. Her work demonstrated that the retina performs sophisticated preprocessing—such as contrast normalization, spatial filtering, and parallel encoding—before signals reach higher visual centers.

Her research has lasting influence on both neuroscience and biomedical engineering, laying the groundwork for modern computational models of vision.

== Awards and honors ==
- Jonas Stein Friedenwald Award, Association for Research in Vision and Ophthalmology (1983)
- Ludwig von Sallmann Prize, International Congress of Eye Research (1982)
- Elected Fellow of the American Academy of Arts and Sciences (1983)
