= Edward Kravitz =

American neuroscientist (1932–2025)

- Born: December 19, 1932; New York City, U.S.
- Died: September 21, 2025 (aged 92)
- Education: University of Michigan (PhD); City College of New York (BS)
- Known for: Identification of gamma-aminobutyric acid (GABA) as a neurotransmitter
- Awards: American Academy of Arts and Sciences (1976); National Academy of Sciences (1984); National Academy of Medicine (1986); Humboldt Research Award (1992); Guggenheim Fellowship (1992)
- Scientific career
- Fields: Neuroscience
- Workplaces: Harvard Medical School; National Institute of Health
- Thesis: A Directing Effect Of Inorganic Phosphate On The Pathways Of Hexose Phosphate Metabolism (1959)
- Doctoral advisor: Armand Guarino
- Doctoral students: Margaret Livingstone; Thomas Schwarz

Edward Arthur Kravitz (December 19, 1932 – September 21, 2025) was an American neuroscientist and George Packer Berry Professor of Neurobiology at Harvard Medical School. He is widely recognized for demonstrating that gamma-aminobutyric acid (GABA) functions as a neurotransmitter. He and Antony Stretton were the first to use the intracellular dye procion yellow to visualize neuronal architecture. Kravitz's work with neuroamines demonstrated that serotonin and octopamine act as synaptic modulators. Kravitz continued to explore the function of amines in aggression using Homarus americanus, the American lobster, and Drosophila melanogaster, the fruit fly, as model organisms.

== Personal life ==
Ed Kravitz was born in New York to Ada Machlus and Isadore Kravitz. He had one older brother, Bill (1929–2014). Kravitz grew up in The Bronx during the Great Depression. More than once he skipped an entire grade in order to be challenged in school and ended up in college at age 16. Ed met his wife Kathryn Anne Frakes at the University of Michigan; they were married in 1959, with whom he had two sons, David (b. February 21, 1964) and James (b. May 14, 1966), and one granddaughter, Theodora (b. August 9, 2022).

== Scientific career ==
After graduating from Evander Childs High School in The Bronx, Kravitz remained in the neighborhood he grew up in and began his studies at City College of New York (CCNY), where he earned a double major in Biology and Chemistry. Unsure of what to do next, Kravitz applied to be an officer in the U.S. Army Medical Corps as well as to two medical schools, and for a Research Assistant position. He ended up at Sloan-Kettering in the laboratory of George Tarnowski. Under the supervision of George Tarnowski, Lou Kaplan, a young biochemist at the time, and Christine Riley, director of the chemotherapy unit, Kravitz began an independent research project studying amino acid metabolism in ascites tumor cells.

In 1954, Kravitz began graduate school at the University of Michigan. He met a lot of great colleagues at this time, including Marshall Nirenberg with whom he shared an apartment on Huron Avenue in Ann Arbor. Kravitz's thesis work was done in the laboratory of Armand Guarino and led to his first paper “On the effect of inorganic phosphate on hexose phosphate metabolism” which was published in the journal Science. In 1959 he received his Ph.D. in Biological Chemistry and began working in Earl Stadtman's laboratory at the National Institutes of Health.

Although at one time Kravitz planned on pursuing two additional post-doctoral positions after studying morphine metabolism in the Stadtman laboratory, he was recruited to Harvard Medical School by Steve Kuffler in 1960. Almost immediately, he began working with Steve Kuffler, Dave Potter and Nico van Gelder on the experiments that would eventually demonstrate that GABA functions as a neurotransmitter. From his biochemistry training and friends at NIH, Kravitz knew that by growing Pseudomonas fluorescens on GABA as a sole carbon source, an enzymatic assay could be used to quantify the amount of GABA in the neurons of crustaceans. Using this enzymatic assay, the group quickly learned that GABA was highly expressed in inhibitory neurons. Later Kravitz worked with Masanori Otsuka, Les Iversen, and Zach Hall to show that GABA was released from inhibitory neurons of lobsters. After his first talk on the work at the Marine Biological Laboratory in Woods Hole, David Nachmanson commented “Well, we don’t know what that little bit of an amino acid that you see being released is when you stimulate a nerve, but it certainly is not a chemical transmitter compound, because we all know that transmission is electrical”.

The second project Kravtiz took on in the mid-1960s was much more anatomical in nature. In collaboration with his postdoctoral fellow, Antony Stretton, Ed began developing a technique to visualize the structure of neurons in order to determine whether neuronal shapes are genetically specified. Two other Scientists at Harvard Medical School, Ed Furshpan and Jaime Alvarez, had been using intracellular dyes to localize their recording electrodes in the brains of fish, but none of their dyes were able to stain the neuropil processes of the injected neurons. Kravitz and Stretton contacted Imperial Chemicals, a manufacturer of fabric staining dyes located in Providence, RI and obtained over 120 dyes to inject into lobster neurons. In the end they found a single dye, Procion Yellow, that was highly soluble, readily released from microelectrodes, completely filled cells and their processes, survived fixation and dehydration, and, most importantly, was fluorescent. Using Procion Yellow, Kravitz, Stretton, and Edith Maier found that neurons from two different animals had strikingly similar morphological shapes. They eventually injected over 100 physiologically identified neurons, processed and sectioned the ganglia, and reconstructed the cell shapes by hand from photographs of the serial sections.

In the 1970s, Kravitz's laboratory turned their focus back to neurotransmitters. After finding evidence that glutamate acts as an excitatory transmitter in crustaceans, they found that acetylcholine functions as the lobster sensory transmitter compound. Around this time, the laboratory also began experimenting with the neuroamines serotonin and octopamine. By trying to understand how naturally occurring neuromodulators might act, Margaret Livingstone, a graduate student at the time, injected serotonin or octopamine into two different lobsters. The results were surprising: the lobster injected with serotonin stood tall and looked just like a dominant animal while the lobster injected with octopamine adopted a lowered posture and looked like a subordinate animal. These lobster injection experiments were the birth of the aggressive behavior studies that are still ongoing in Kravitz's laboratory today.

In the 1980s and 1990s Kravitz's laboratory evolved into a neuroethology laboratory. In collaboration with his postdoctoral fellow Robert Huber, a quantitative analysis of lobster fighting behavior was underway. Lobsters proved to be an excellent model system for studies on aggression due to the ease in getting animals to fight and the fact that anatomical and physiological studies were possible. However, Kravitz soon realized that in order to discover new neurons and pathways that were important for aggression, he needed an organism whose genome was sequenced and where genetic methods were available for solving sophisticated problems, leading to work with Drosophila melanogaster.. After transitioning to Drosophila, he trained many postdoctoral fellows who are now faculty, including Sarah Certel (University of Montana), Joanne Yew (University of Hawaii), Adelaine Leung (University of Saskatchewan, Canada), Maria de la Paz Fernandez (Indiana University), and Severine Trannoy (University of Toulouse).

== Selected honors and awards ==
- Member, American Academy of Arts and Sciences (1976)
- Einstein Visiting Fellow, Hebrew University (1981)
- Member, National Academy of Sciences, USA (1984)
- Member, Institute of Medicine (1986)
- Governing Council, Institute of Medicine (1990–1994)
- Humboldt Research Award (1992)
- John S. Guggenheim Fellowship (1992)
- A. Clifford Barger Lifetime Achievement in Mentoring Award, Harvard Medical School (1998)
- Education Award, Association of Neuroscience Departments and Programs (2001)
- Harold Amos Diversity Award, Harvard Medical School (2007)
- Fellow and president, International Society for Neuroethology (2014)
