= Stephen Kuffler =

Hungarian-American neurophysiologist (1913–1980)

Stephen W. Kuffler
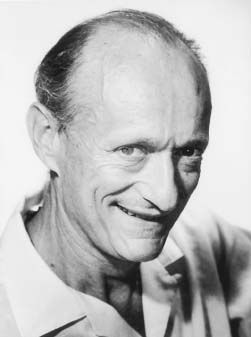
- Born: August 24, 1913; Táp, Kingdom of Hungary, Austro-Hungarian Empire
- Died: October 11, 1980 (aged 67); United States
- Education: Vienna Medical School
- Known for: Neurophysiology; Neurobiology
- Awards: Louisa Gross Horwitz Prize (1972); Dickson Prize (1974); Ralph W. Gerard Prize in Neuroscience (1978)
- Scientific career
- Fields: Neurophysiology; Neurobiology
- Workplaces: University of Sydney; University of Chicago; Johns Hopkins University; Marine Biological Laboratory at Woods Hole; Harvard University; Salk Institute
- Doctoral advisor: John Carew Eccles
- Doctoral students: David Hubel; Torsten Wiesel; Eric Kandel; John Graham Nicholls; Horace Barlow

Stephen William Kuffler ForMemRS (August 24, 1913 – October 11, 1980) was a Hungarian-American neurophysiologist. He is often referred to as the "Father of Modern Neuroscience". Kuffler, alongside noted Nobel Laureates Sir John Eccles and Sir Bernard Katz gave research lectures at the University of Sydney, strongly influencing its intellectual environment while working at Sydney Hospital. He founded the Harvard neurobiology department in 1966, and made numerous seminal contributions to our understanding of vision, neural coding, and the neural implementation of behavior. He is known for his research on neuromuscular junctions in frogs, presynaptic inhibition, and the neurotransmitter GABA. In 1972, he was awarded the Louisa Gross Horwitz Prize from Columbia University.

== Early life ==
Stephen Kuffler was born on August 24, 1913, in Táp, a village in Hungary. His father, Wilhelm Kuffler, was a landowner living on a large estate. After his mother died when he was five years old, Steve was brought up by governesses at home until he went to a Jesuit boarding school in Austria at the age of ten, where he stayed until 1932

== Honors and awards ==
Kuffler was widely recognized as an original and creative neuroscientist. In addition to numerous prizes, honorary degrees, and special lectureships from countries over the world, he was elected to the American Academy of Arts and Sciences in 1960, National Academy of Sciences in 1964, the Royal Society as Foreign Member in 1971, and the American Philosophical Society in 1978. In 1964 he was named the Robert Winthrop professor of neurophysiology and neuropharmacology. From 1966 to 1974 he was the Robert Winthrop professor of neurobiology, and in 1974 he became John Franklin Enders university professor.

A detailed, affectionate, and authoritative account of Stephen Kuffler's life and work has been provided by Sir Bernard Katz (Biographical Memoirs of Fellows of the Royal Society, vol. 28, pp. 225–59, 1982) and in a book entitled Steve, Remembrances of Stephen W. Kuffler, compiled and introduced by U. J. McMahan (Sunderland, Mass.: Sinauer Associates, 1990). An account of Kuffler's work is given by Eric R. Kandel, In Search of Memory: The Emergence of a New Science of Mind (New York: Norton, 2006), stating: 'I don't think anyone on the American scene since then has been as influential or as beloved as Steve Kuffler.'

== See also ==
- Seymour Benzer
- David Hubel
- Eric R. Kandel
- David Rioch
- Gunther Stent
- Torsten Wiesel
- Louisa Gross Horwitz Prize
