= Simple cell =

Brain cell

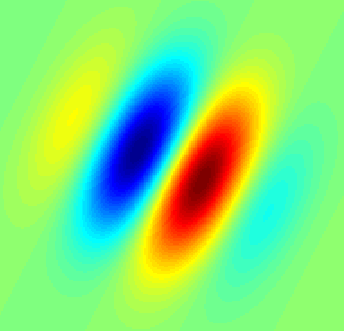
- Gabor filter-type receptive field typical for a simple cell. Blue regions indicate inhibition, red facilitation

Details
- Part of: primary visual cortex
- System: Visual system

A simple cell in the primary visual cortex is a cell that responds primarily to oriented edges and gratings (bars of particular orientations). Torsten Wiesel and David Hubel discovered these cells in the late 1950s.

Such cells are tuned to different frequencies and orientations, even with different phase relationships, possibly to extract disparity (depth) information and to attribute depth to detected lines and edges. This may result in a 3D 'wire-frame' representation as used in computer graphics. The fact that input from the left and right eyes is very close in the so-called cortical hypercolumns indicates that depth processing occurs very early, aiding the recognition of 3D objects.

Later, many other cells with specific functions have been discovered: (a) end-stopped cells, which are thought to detect singularities like line and edge crossings, vertices, and line endings; (b) bar and grating cells. The latter are not linear operators because a bar cell does not respond when seeing a bar which is part of a periodic grating, and a grating cell does not respond when seeing an isolated bar.

Using the mathematical Gabor model with sine and cosine components (phases), complex cells are modeled by computing the modulus of complex Gabor responses. Both simple and complex cells are linear operators and are seen as filters because they respond selectively to a large number of patterns.

However, it has been claimed that the Gabor model does not conform to the anatomical structure of the visual system as it short-cuts the LGN and uses the 2D image as it is projected on the retina. Azzopardi and Petkov have proposed a computational model of a simple cell, which combines the responses of model LGN cells with center-surround receptive fields (RFs). They call it the Combination of RFs (CORF) model. Besides orientation selectivity, it exhibits cross-orientation suppression, contrasts invariant orientation tuning, and response saturation. These properties are observed in actual simple cells but are not possessed by the Gabor model. Using simulated reverse correlation, they also demonstrate that the RF map of the CORF model can be divided into elongated excitatory and inhibitory regions typical of simple cells.

Lindeberg has derived axiomatically determined models of simple cells in terms of directional derivatives of affine Gaussian kernels over the spatial domain in combination with temporal derivatives of either non-causal or time-causal scale-space kernels over the temporal domain and shown that this theory both leads to predictions about receptive fields with good qualitative agreement with the biological receptive field measurements performed by DeAngelis et al. and guarantees good theoretical properties of the mathematical receptive field model, including covariance and invariance properties under natural image transformations. An analysis of the orientation selectivity properties of such idealized models for simple cells is given in.

== History ==
These cells were discovered by Torsten Wiesel and David Hubel in the late 1950s.

Hubel and Wiesel named these cells "simple," as opposed to "complex cell," because they shared the properties:

1. They have distinct excitatory and inhibitory regions.
2. These regions follow the summation property.
3. These regions have mutual antagonism - excitatory and inhibitory regions balance themselves out in diffuse lighting.
4. It is possible to predict responses to moving stimuli given the map of excitatory and inhibitory regions.

Some other researchers, such as Peter Jackson and Peter Schiller, used different definitions for simple and complex cells.

== See also ==
- Visual system
- Spatiotemporal receptive field
- Complex cell
