= Torsten Wiesel =

Swedish neuroscientist (born 1924)

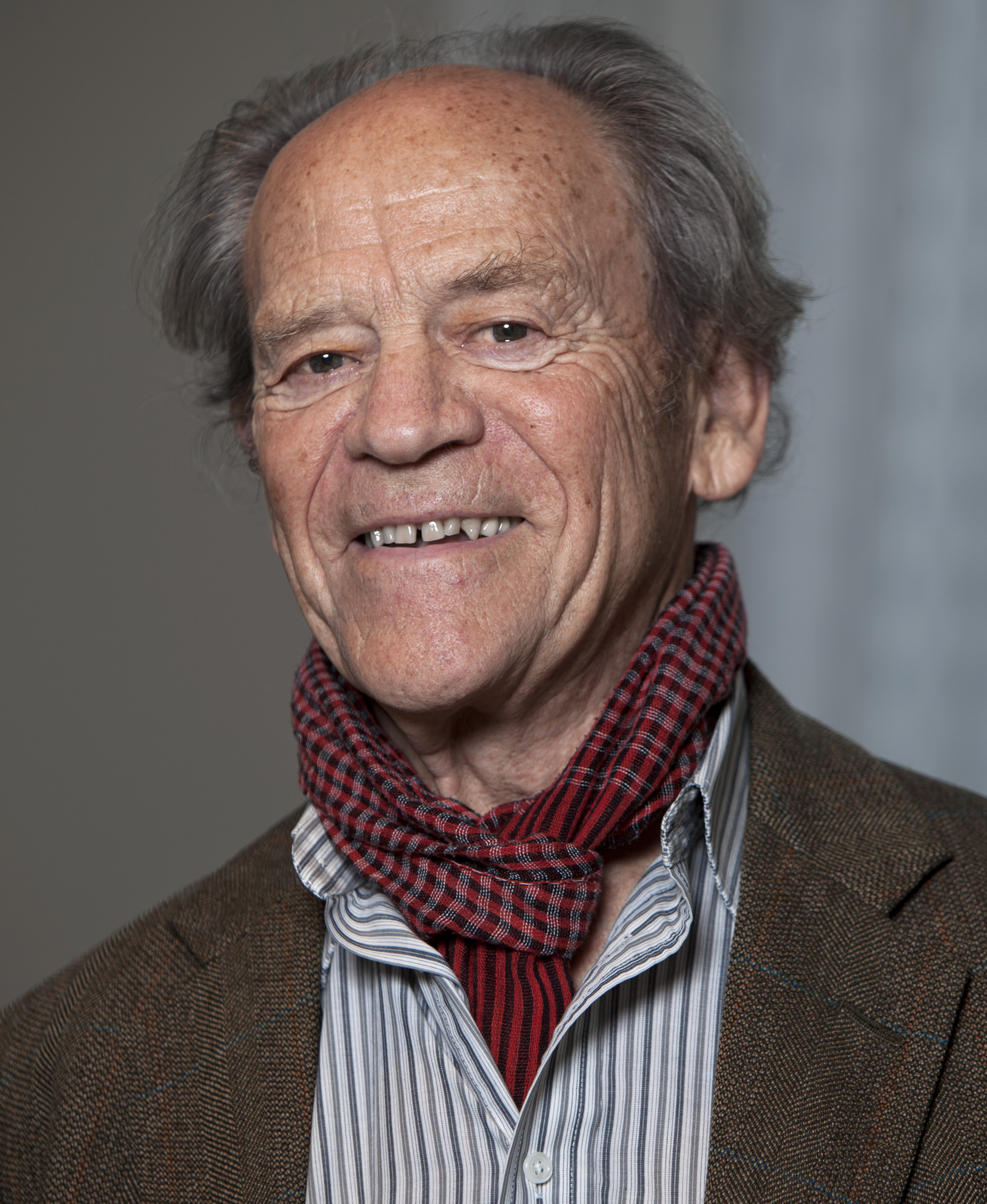
- Wiesel in 2010

7th President of Rockefeller University
- In office 1991–1998
- Preceded by: David Baltimore
- Succeeded by: Arnold J. Levine

Personal details
- Born: Torsten Nils Wiesel; 3 June 1924 (age 102) Uppsala, Sweden
- Spouses: Teeri Stenhammar (m. 1956; div. 1970); Ann Yee (m. 1973; div. 1981); Jean Stein (m. 1995; div. 2007); Lizette Mususa Reyes (m. 2008)
- Children: 1
- Scientific career
- Education: Karolinska Institute
- Known for: Visual system
- Awards: Karl Spencer Lashley Award (1977); Louisa Gross Horwitz Prize (1978); Dickson Prize (1980); Nobel Prize in Physiology or Medicine (1981); National Medal of Science (2005)
- Workplaces: Johns Hopkins School of Medicine; Rockefeller University; Harvard University

Torsten Nils Wiesel (born 3 June 1924) is a Swedish neurophysiologist. With David H. Hubel, he received the 1981 Nobel Prize in Physiology or Medicine, for their discoveries concerning information processing in the visual system; the prize was shared with Roger W. Sperry for his independent research on the cerebral hemispheres.

== Career ==
Wiesel was born in Uppsala, Sweden, in 1924, the youngest of five children. In 1947, he began his scientific career in Carl Gustaf Bernhard's laboratory at the Karolinska Institute, where he received his medical degree in 1954. He went on to teach in the institute's department of physiology and worked in the child psychiatry unit of the Karolinska Hospital. In 1955 he moved to the United States to work at Johns Hopkins School of Medicine under Stephen Kuffler. Wiesel began a fellowship in ophthalmology, and in 1958 he became an assistant professor. That same year, he met David Hubel, beginning a collaboration that would last over twenty years. In 1959 Wiesel and Hubel moved to Harvard University. He became an instructor in pharmacology at Harvard Medical School, beginning a 24-year career with the university. He became professor in the new department of neurobiology in 1968 and its chair in 1973.

In 1983, Wiesel joined the faculty of Rockefeller University as Vincent and Brooke Astor Professor and head of the Laboratory of Neurobiology. He was president of the university from 1991 to 1998. At Rockefeller University he remains co-director of the Shelby White and Leon Levy Center for Mind, Brain and Behavior.

From 2000 to 2009, Wiesel served as Secretary-General of the Human Frontier Science Program, an organization headquartered in Strasbourg, France, which supports international and interdisciplinary collaboration between investigators in the life sciences. Wiesel also has chaired the scientific advisory board of China's National Institute of Biological Science (NIBS) in Beijing, and co-chairs the board of governors of the Okinawa Institute of Science and Technology (OIST). He is also member of the boards of the Pew Center on Global Climate Change, the Hospital for Special Surgery, and an advisory board member of the European Brain Research Institute (EBRI).

Wiesel has also served as chair of the board of the Aaron Diamond AIDS Research Center (1995–2001), president of the Society for Neuroscience (1978–1979), and the International Brain Research Organization (1998–2004). He was chair of the board of governors of the New York Academy of Sciences (2001–2006); and he was the academy's chairman and interim director in 2001–2002.

== Research ==
The Hubel and Wiesel experiments greatly expanded the scientific knowledge of sensory processing. In one experiment, done in 1959, they inserted a microelectrode into the primary visual cortex of an anesthetized cat. They then projected patterns of light and dark on a screen in front of the cat. They found that some neurons fired rapidly when presented with lines at one angle, while others responded best to another angle. They called these neurons "simple cells." Still other neurons, which they termed "complex cells," responded best to lines of a certain angle moving in one direction. These studies showed how the visual system builds an image from simple stimuli into more complex representations.

Hubel and Wiesel were awarded the Nobel Prize in 1981 for their work on ocular dominance columns in the 1960s and 1970s. By depriving kittens from using one eye, they showed that columns in the primary visual cortex receiving inputs from the other eye took over the areas that would normally receive input from the deprived eye. These kittens also did not develop areas receiving input from both eyes, a feature needed for binocular vision and stereopsis. Hubel and Wiesel's experiments showed that the ocular dominance develops irreversibly early in childhood development. These studies opened the door for the understanding and treatment of childhood cataracts and strabismus. They were also important in the study of cortical plasticity.

== Awards and honors ==
Wiesel is a member of the Royal Swedish Academy of Sciences, the Serbian Academy of Sciences and Arts, and a foreign fellow of the Indian National Science Academy. He also holds the following awards and honors:

- Honorary degree, University of Pavia in 2006.
- Order of the Rising Sun, Grand Cordon, 2009 (Japan).
- Honorary Doctoral Degree in Science, University of Cambodia in 2010
- Nobel Prize in Physiology or Medicine in 1981
- Louisa Gross Horwitz Prize from Columbia University, in 1978
- Elected a member of the American Academy of Arts and Sciences in 1967
- Dr. Jules C. Stein Award in 1971
- Ferrier Medal and Lecture from the Royal Society in 1971
- Lewis S. Rosenstiel Award in 1972
- Freidenwald Award in 1975
- Karl Spencer Lashley Award in 1977
- Ledlie Prize in 1980
- Elected a member of the United States National Academy of Sciences in 1980
- Elected a member of the American Philosophical Society in 1982
- Elected a Foreign Member of the Royal Society (ForMemRS) in 1982
- W.H. Helmerich III Award in 1989
- Ralph W. Gerard Prize in Neuroscience in 1993
- Helen Keller Prize for Vision Research in 1996
- Presidential Award in 1998
- David Rall Medal in 2005
- National Medal of Science in 2005 (US).
- Marshall M. Parks MD Medal of Excellence in 2007

In 2001, Wiesel was nominated for a position on an advisory panel in the National Institutes of Health to advise on assisting research in developing countries. Republican Tommy Thompson, who at the time was Secretary of Health and Human Services, rejected Wiesel. In addition to Wiesel, Thompson's office rejected another 18 (out of 26) nominations and in return recommended other scientists that whistleblower Gerald Keusch described in an interview as "lightweights" with "no scientific credibility". When Wiesel's name was rejected, an official in Thompson's office told Keusch that Wiesel had "signed too many full-page letters in The New York Times critical of President Bush." This incident was cited by the advocacy group Union of Concerned Scientists as part of a report detailing their allegations of abuse of science under President George W. Bush's administration.

Wiesel was among the eight 2005 recipients of the National Medal of Science. In 2006, he was awarded the Ramon Y Cajal Gold Medal from the Spanish National Research Council (CSIC - Consejo Superior de Investigaciones Cientificas). In 2007, both Wiesel and Hubel were awarded the Marshall M. Parks, MD Medal from The Children's Eye Foundation.

== Personal life ==
Wiesel is married to Lizette Mususa Reyes (m. 2008). Wiesel was married to Teeri Stenhammar from 1956 to 1970, Ann Yee from 1973 to 1981, and author and editor Jean Stein from 1995 to 2007. His daughter Sara Elisabeth was born in 1975.

Wiesel turned 100 on 3 June 2024.

=== Human rights ===
Wiesel has done much work as a global human rights advocate. He served for 10 years (1994–2004) as chair of the Committee of Human Rights of the National Academies of Science in the US, as well as the International Human Rights Network of Academies and Scholarly Societies. He was awarded the David Rall Medal from the Institute of Medicine in 2005, in recognition of this important work. In 2009, Wiesel was awarded the Grand Cordon Order of the Rising Sun Medal in Japan.

Wiesel is a founding member of the Israeli-Palestinian Science Organization, a nongovernmental nonprofit established in 2004 to support collaborative research between scientists in Israel and Palestine.

== See also ==
- Neocognitron
