= David H. Hubel =

Canadian neurophysiologist (1926–2013)

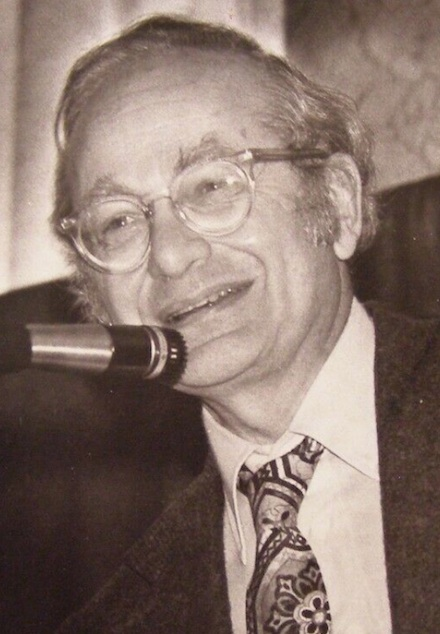
- Hubel in 1992
- Born: David Hunter Hubel; February 27, 1926; Windsor, Ontario, Canada
- Died: September 22, 2013 (aged 87); Lincoln, Massachusetts, U.S.
- Education: McGill University
- Known for: Visual system
- Spouse: Ruth Izzard (m. 1953)
- Awards: Rosenstiel Award (1971); Karl Spencer Lashley Award (1977); Louisa Gross Horwitz Prize (1978); Dickson Prize (1980); Nobel Prize in Physiology or Medicine (1981); Ralph W. Gerard Prize in Neuroscience (1993)
- Scientific career
- Fields: Neurophysiologist
- Workplaces: Johns Hopkins School of Medicine; Harvard University

David Hunter Hubel FRS (February 27, 1926 – September 22, 2013) was an American Canadian neurophysiologist noted for his studies of the structure and function of the visual cortex. He was co-recipient with Torsten Wiesel of the 1981 Nobel Prize in Physiology or Medicine (shared with Roger W. Sperry), for their discoveries concerning information processing in the visual system. For much of his career, Hubel worked as the Professor of Neurobiology at Johns Hopkins University and Harvard Medical School. In 1978, Hubel and Wiesel were awarded the Louisa Gross Horwitz Prize from Columbia University. In 1983, Hubel received the Golden Plate Award of the American Academy of Achievement.

== Early life and education ==
Hubel was born in Windsor, Ontario, Canada, to American parents in 1926. His grandfather emigrated as a child to the United States from the Bavarian town of Nördlingen. In 1929, his family moved to Montreal, where he spent his formative years. His father was a chemical engineer and Hubel developed a keen interest in science right from childhood, making many experiments in chemistry and electronics. From age six to eighteen, he attended Strathcona Academy in Outremont, Quebec, about which he said, "[I owe] much to the excellent teachers there, especially to Julia Bradshaw, a dedicated, vivacious history teacher with a memorable Irish temper, who awakened me to the possibility of learning how to write readable English." He studied mathematics and physics at McGill University, and then completed medical school there in 1951 and followed that with three years of residency (a year of internship and two of residency in neurology) at the Montreal General Hospital.

== Career ==
In 1954, Hubel moved to the United States to work at Johns Hopkins School of Medicine as an assistant resident in Neurology. He was later drafted by the army and served at Walter Reed Army Institute of Research (WRAIR). There, he began recording from the primary visual cortex of sleeping and awake cats. At WRAIR, he invented the modern metal microelectrode out of Stoner-Mudge lacquer and tungsten, and the modern hydraulic microdrive, which he had to learn basic machinist skills to produce. In 1958, Hubel moved to Johns Hopkins and began his collaborations with Wiesel, and discovered orientation selectivity and columnar organization in the visual cortex. One year later, he joined the faculty of Harvard University. In 1981, Hubel became a founding member of the World Cultural Council. From 1988 to 1989 he was the president of the Society for Neuroscience. He was a member of the American Academy of Arts and Sciences, the United States National Academy of Sciences, and the American Philosophical Society.

== Research ==
Hubel in his lab, 1980

The Hubel and Wiesel experiments greatly expanded the scientific knowledge of sensory processing. The partnership lasted over twenty years and became known as one of the most prominent research pairings in science. In one experiment, done in 1959, they inserted a microelectrode into the primary visual cortex of an anesthetized cat. They then projected patterns of light and dark on a screen in front of the cat. They found that some neurons fired rapidly when presented with lines at one angle, while others responded best to another angle. Some of these neurons responded to light patterns and dark patterns differently. Hubel and Wiesel called these neurons simple cells." Still other neurons, which they termed complex cells, detected edges regardless of where they were placed in the receptive field of the neuron and could preferentially detect motion in certain directions. These studies showed how the visual system constructs complex representations of visual information from simple stimulus features.

Hubel and Wiesel received the Nobel Prize for two major contributions: firstly, their work on the development of the visual system, which involved a description of ocular dominance columns in the 1960s and 1970s; and secondly, their work establishing a foundation for visual neurophysiology, describing how signals from the eye are processed by visual parcels in the neo-cortex to generate edge detectors, motion detectors, stereoscopic depth detectors, and color detectors, building blocks of the visual scene. By depriving kittens of using one eye, they showed that columns in the primary visual cortex receiving inputs from the other eye took over the areas that would normally receive input from the deprived eye. This has important implications for the understanding of deprivation amblyopia, a type of visual loss due to unilateral visual deprivation during the so-called critical period. These kittens also did not develop areas receiving input from both eyes, a feature needed for binocular vision. Hubel and Wiesel's experiments showed that the ocular dominance develops irreversibly early in childhood development. These studies opened the door for the understanding and treatment of childhood cataracts and strabismus. They were also important in the study of cortical plasticity.

Furthermore, the understanding of sensory processing in animals served as inspiration for the SIFT descriptor (Lowe, 1999), which is a local feature used in computer vision for tasks such as object recognition and wide-baseline matching, etc. The SIFT descriptor is arguably the most widely used feature type for these tasks. Hubel was elected a Foreign Member of the Royal Society (ForMemRS) in 1982.

== Personal life ==
Hubel married Ruth Izzard in 1953; she died February 17, 2013. The couple had three sons and four grandchildren. He died in Lincoln, Massachusetts, from kidney failure on September 22, 2013, at the age of 87.

== See also ==
- Neocognitron
