= Anne Stuart =

Anne Stuart may refer to:

== 16th century ==
- Anne, Countess of Auvergne (1496–1524), married James Stewart, duke of Albany
- Anne of Denmark (1574–1619), wife of James I of Great Britain (VI of Scotland)

== 17th century ==
- Anne Stuart (daughter of Charles I) (1637–1640), daughter of Charles I of Great Britain
- Anne Hyde (1638–1671), married name Anne Stuart, wife of James II of Great Britain (VII of Scotland) and mother of Mary II and Queen Anne
- Anne, Queen of Great Britain (1665–1714)

== 18th century ==
- Anne Stuart Percy, Lady Warkworth (c. 1745–1813)

== 20th century ==
- Anne Mackenzie-Stuart (1930–2008), activist
- Anne Stuart (novelist) (born 1948), American romance novelist
- Ann Stuart (academic administrator), chancellor and president of Texas Woman's University
- Ann Stuart (scientist), neurophysiologist at UNC Chapel Hill

== See also ==
- Amelia Stewart, Viscountess Castlereagh (1772–1829), member of Regency London high society
- Anna Stewart (disambiguation)
