= Brian (software) =

Computer software simulating neural networks

- Developers: Romain Brette, Dan Goodman, Marcel Stimberg
- Stable release: 2.10.1 / 5 December 2025; 6 months ago
- Written in: Python
- Operating system: Cross-platform
- Type: Neural network software
- License: CeCILL
- Website: briansimulator.org
- Repository: github.com/brian-team/brian2

Brian is an open source Python package for developing simulations of networks of spiking neurons.

== Details ==
Brian is aimed at researchers developing models based on networks of spiking neurons. The general design is aimed at maximising flexibility, simplicity and users' development speed. Users specify neuron models by giving their differential equations in standard mathematical form as strings, create groups of neurons and connect them via synapses. This is in contrast to the approach taken by many neural simulators in which users select from a predefined set of neuron models.

Brian is written in Python. Computationally, it is based around the concept of code generation: users specify the model in Python but behind the scenes Brian generates, compiles and runs code in one of several languages (including Python, Cython and C++). In addition there is a "standalone" mode in which Brian generates an entire C++ source code tree with no dependency on Brian, allowing models to be run on platforms where Python is not available.

== Example ==
The following code defines, runs and plots a randomly connected network of leaky integrate and fire neurons with exponential inhibitory and excitatory currents.

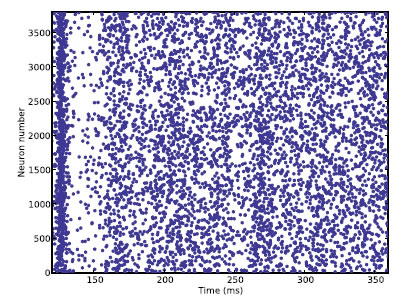
Sample raster plot from randomly connected network of integrate and fire neurons with exponential inhibitory and excitatory currents

from brian2 import *

eqs = """
dv/dt  = (ge+gi-(v+49*mV))/(20*ms) : volt
dge/dt = -ge/(5*ms)                : volt
dgi/dt = -gi/(10*ms)               : volt
"""
P = NeuronGroup(4000, eqs, threshold="v>-50*mV", reset="v=-60*mV")
P.v = -60 * mV
Pe = P[:3200]
Pi = P[3200:]
Ce = Synapses(Pe, P, on_pre="ge+=1.62*mV")
Ce.connect(p=0.02)
Ci = Synapses(Pi, P, on_pre="gi-=9*mV")
Ci.connect(p=0.02)
M = SpikeMonitor(P)
run(1 * second)
plot(M.t / ms, M.i, ".")
show()

== Comparison to other simulators ==
Brian is primarily, although not solely, aimed at single compartment neuron models. Simulators focused on multi-compartmental models include Neuron, GENESIS, and its derivatives.

The focus of Brian is on flexibility and ease of use, and only supports simulations running on a single machine. The NEST simulator includes facilities for distributing simulations across a cluster.

== Awards ==
- 2023 Open Science Award for Open Source Research Software in the category "Documentation"
