= Paul Bressloff =

English American biophysicist and mathematical neuroscientist

Paul C. Bressloff is a British applied mathematician, biophysicist and mathematical neuroscientist. As of 2025, Bressloff is currently the Chair in Applied Mathematics and Stochastic Processes in the Faculty of Natural Sciences at Imperial College London. He was a full professor of Department of Mathematics at the University of Utah between 2001 and 2023.

== Education ==
Bressloff obtained an MA with First Class Honors from the University of Oxford in 1982, and obtained his Ph.D from the Department of Mathematics at King's College in 1988. His thesis was titled Quantum field theory of superstrings in the light-cone gauge.

== Research ==
Bressloff has published extensively on a wide variety of applied and theoretical topics. As of 2022, he has an H-index of 54, and he has published over three-hundred and fifty articles, three textbooks, and has co-written a non-fiction popular science book. He has advised more than twenty PhD recipients.

=== Books ===
Bressloff is the author of three textbooks in computational biology, one of them dealing with stochastic processes in cellular biology.

- Bursting: The Genesis of Rhythm in the Nervous System with Stephen Coombes (2003)
- Waves in Neural Media: From Single Neurons to Neural Fields (2013)
- Stochastic Processes in Cell Biology (2014)
- Stochastic Processes in Cell Biology: Volume I (2022)
- Stochastic Processes in Cell Biology: Volume II (2022)
