= Trion =

Trion may refer to:

- Trion, Georgia, a town in Chattooga County, Georgia, United States
- Trion (neural networks), a localized group of neurons in the cortex and a basic unit in the trion model
- Trion (physics), a quasiparticle in a solid
- Trion Worlds, a video game developer and publisher
- Trion Supercars, an American car manufacturer
- The √3:2 rectangle, one of the twelve special orthogons

== In fiction ==
- Alpha Trion, the name of several fictional characters in the various Transformers universes
- Trion, a special kind of energy in World Trigger
