= Anna Stewart =

Anna Stewart may refer to:

- Anita Stewart (Anna May Stewart, 1895–1961), American actress
- Anna Stewart (journalist), TV reporter for CNN
- Anna Stewart, daughter of Andrew Stuart, 1st Baron Castle Stuart
- Jane Stewart (executive) (Anna Jane Stewart, 1917–1990), American public relations executive
- Anna Stewart (activist) (1947–1983), Australian activist
- Anna Stewart (businesswoman) (1964–2017), British businesswoman

== See also ==
- Anne Stuart (disambiguation)
