= Li Zhaoping =

Chinese scientist

- 李兆平
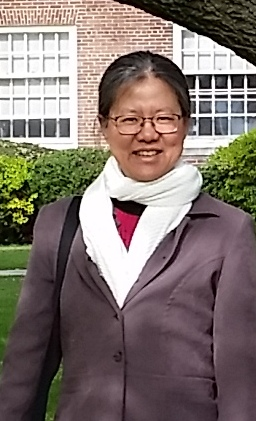
- Born: 1964 (age 61–62)
- Education: Fudan University (BS); California Institute of Technology (PhD)
- Known for: V1 Saliency Hypothesis(V1SH).
- Spouse: Peter Dayan
- Scientific career
- Fields: Computational and Experimental Neuroscience; Experimental Psychology
- Institutions: Fermi National Accelerator Laboratory; Institute for Advanced Study; Rockefeller University; Hong Kong University of Science and Technology; University College London; University of Tuebingen; Max Planck Institute for Biological Cybernetics
- Thesis: A model of the olfactory bulb and beyond (1989)
- Doctoral advisor: John J. Hopfield
- Website: lizhaoping.org

Li Zhaoping (Chinese: 李兆平) is a Chinese neuroscientist at the University of Tübingen in Germany. She is the only woman to win the first place in CUSPEA, a 1980s annual national physics admission examination in China, during CUSPEA's 10-year history (1979–1989). She proposed V1 Saliency Hypothesis (V1SH), and is the author of Understanding vision: theory, models, and data published by Oxford University Press.

== Education ==
Li Zhaoping graduated from Fudan University in Shanghai in 1984 with a bachelor's degree in physics. During 1984 to 1989, she did her Ph.D. study in physics in California Institute of Technology. Her Ph.D. supervisor was John Hopfield.

== Career ==
After a brief stay in Fermilab, Zhaoping was a member of the Institute for Advanced Study in Princeton in 1990–1992, and then was a postdoctoral fellow in Rockefeller University in 1992–1994.

In 1998, Li Zhaoping, together with Geoffrey Hinton and Peter Dayan, co-founded the Gatsby Computational Neuroscience Unit in University College London.

Currently, Li Zhaoping is a professor at the University of Tübingen. She is also the head of the department of Sensory and Sensorimotor Systems in the Max Planck Institute for Biological Cybernetics.

== Personal life ==
She is married to Prof. Peter Dayan, the director of the Max Planck Institute for Biological Cybernetics.

== Research and theory ==
Li Zhaoping is known as the creator of the V1 Saliency Hypothesis, V1SH (pronounced 'vish'), that the primary visual cortex (V1) in primates creates a saliency map of the visual field to guide visual attention or gaze shifts exogenously.

Proposed in the late-1990s, V1SH was unpopular initially, since it was contrary to the main and popular idea that the frontal and parietal areas of the brain are responsible for the saliency map. As V1SH gathered more experimental support, Zhaoping became more sought after for keynote or invited speeches in international conferences, and V1SH rises from being unpopular to being controversial. Some report experimental data for the theory, while others report evidence against it. It is argued that if V1SH holds, then the framework to understand how our brain solves the vision problem should be substantially changed, as described by the Central-peripheral Dichotomy theory which in turn has its own experimental support.

Zhaoping also used a model to propose that feedback from the olfactory cortex to the olfactory bulb serves to segment odors from background for individual odor recognition and carries out other top-down controls, this proposal predicts and explains a diversity of behavioral and neural data.
