= Neuromimetic intelligence =

Neuroscience concept

Neuromimetic intelligence, also referred to as computational neuroscience, is a system in which computational models methods apply underlying concepts of neural processes. The framework of this approach closely refers to the study of perception, action, learning, memory and cognition within Neuroscience.

Analyzing the brain at the neural level, for example, provides an enhanced understanding of how information flow can be conveyed and exchanged within the mechanisms of a computer in an adaptive, integrated, unified, and autonomous manner. This example demonstrates the application of neuroscience at the microscopic level among computational dynamics.

Computational neuroscience is not limited to microscopic levels with regard to biology. Parallels along microscopic and macroscopic levels of biological applications also exist. For example, the dynamic neural field within the brain that corresponds to processes such as filtering, associating, and organizing is implemented to computational structures to execute pragmatic and sophisticated systems.
