= CUSPEA =

China-U.S. Physics Examination and Application

CUSPEA (China-U.S. Physics Examination and Application, 李政道奖学金) was an examination and admission system used by the physics departments of some American and Canadian universities for graduate school admission from the People's Republic of China between 1979 and 1989.

It was created by the Chinese-American Nobel laureate in physics Professor Tsung-Dao Lee (诺贝尔物理学奖得主李政道教授) and Chinese physics community as an alternative graduate school admission procedure. At that time in China, higher education was still recovering from the Cultural Revolution; school transcripts and recommendation letters were difficult to evaluate. Furthermore, standardized tests such as the Graduate Record Examination were unavailable in China.

== Details ==
The CUSPEA exam was in English and had a similar scope to that of Ph.D. written qualifying exams in major American universities. The questions were prepared by physics professors from participating North American universities—starting with Columbia University where Lee worked, and eventually expanded to 97 universities. Committees of physicists in China administer and grade the exams. The examinees are usually senior physics majors from top-ranking Chinese universities. Those who passed the exam are followed up by an interview by a small American delegation.

According to US physicist Sam Treiman, early applicants to the program included many older students, whose education had been interrupted by the Cultural Revolution.

Final admission to U.S. graduate schools depended on mutual agreement between the applicant and participating physics departments. Each year, more than 600 Chinese students pre-selected from dozens of top Chinese universities and institutes entered the CUSPEA exam. Among them, about 100 Chinese students selected by their CUSPEA exam scores entered the subsequent application process to go to their PhD studies in the US. Over the years, a total of 915 students went to the US through this program. The three universities with the most students among these 915 students are University of Science and Technology of China (218 students), Peking University (206 students) and Fudan University (127 students). Among the eleven number one students over the eleven years are Xiao-Gang Wen and Qing Hu, currently professors at Massachusetts Institute of Technology, and one female, Li Zhaoping, currently in Max Planck Institute for Biological Cybernetics.

== Similar Exams ==
CUSPEA was so successful that other similar exams soon were created, such as CUSBEA for biochemistry and "Shiing-Shen Chern Project" (陈省身项目) for mathematics. All were stopped in the late 80s in favor of more standard exams.

== Continuation as Mini-CUSPEA and Re-Expansion ==
In the early 1990s, several years after the suspension of the CUSPEA exam, a new program called Mini-CUSPEA was created. The new program name referred to the fact that only one Chinese university, namely Fudan University, was now involved. Likewise, in the U.S., the number of target universities had been shrunk to three - Columbia University, New York University, and the City University of New York.

Mini-CUSPEA applicants sit written exams and attend interviews, similar in style to the old CUSPEA admission tests. Around 6-10 students are admitted annually. The usual requirements (TOEFL and GRE) for Chinese students studying in the U.S. are waived for successful Mini-CUSPEA applicants.

Since 2007, the Mini-CUSPEA program has started to expand. The Chinese universities involved now include Peking University, Tsinghua University and other top universities. Expansion is also planned on the U.S. side.
