= Computational neuroscience =

Branch of neuroscience

Computational neuroscience (also known as theoretical neuroscience or mathematical neuroscience) is a branch of neuroscience which employs mathematics, computer science, theoretical analysis and abstractions of the brain to understand the principles that govern the development, structure, physiology and cognitive abilities of the nervous system.

Computational neuroscience employs computational simulations to validate and solve mathematical models, and so can be seen as a sub-field of theoretical neuroscience; however, the two fields are often synonymous. The term mathematical neuroscience is also used sometimes, to stress the quantitative nature of the field.

Computational neuroscience focuses on the description of biologically plausible neurons (and neural systems) and their physiology and dynamics. It is therefore not directly concerned with biologically unrealistic models used in connectionism, control theory, cybernetics, quantitative psychology, machine learning, artificial neural networks, artificial intelligence and computational learning theory; although mutual inspiration exists and sometimes there is no strict limit between fields, with model abstraction in computational neuroscience depending on research scope and the granularity at which biological entities are analyzed.

Models in theoretical neuroscience are aimed at capturing the essential features of the biological system at multiple spatial-temporal scales, from membrane currents, and chemical coupling via network oscillations, columnar and topographic architecture, nuclei, all the way up to psychological faculties like memory, learning and behavior. These computational models frame hypotheses that can be directly tested by biological or psychological experiments.

== History ==
The term 'computational neuroscience' was introduced by Eric L. Schwartz, who organized a conference, held in 1985 in Carmel, California, at the request of the Systems Development Foundation to provide a summary of the current status of a field which until that point was referred to by a variety of names, such as neural modeling, brain theory and neural networks. The proceedings of this definitional meeting were published in 1990 as the book Computational Neuroscience. The first of the annual open international meetings focused on Computational Neuroscience was organized by James M. Bower and John Miller in San Francisco, California in 1989. The first graduate educational program in computational neuroscience was organized as the Computation and Neural Systems Ph.D. program at the California Institute of Technology in 1986.

The early historical roots of the field can be traced to the work of people including Louis Lapicque, Hodgkin & Huxley, Hubel and Wiesel, and David Marr. Lapicque introduced the integrate and fire model of the neuron in a seminal article published in 1907, a model still popular for artificial neural networks studies because of its simplicity (see a recent review).

In 1952, Hodgkin and Huxley used the voltage-clamp experiments on the squid giant axon to characterize the ionic currents underlying the action potential and formulated the Hodgkin-Huxley model. Hubel and Wiesel discovered that neurons in the primary visual cortex, the first cortical area to process information coming from the retina, have oriented receptive fields and are organized in columns. David Marr's work focused on the interactions between neurons, suggesting computational approaches to the study of how functional groups of neurons within the hippocampus and neocortex interact, store, process, and transmit information. Computational modeling of biophysically realistic neurons and dendrites began with the work of Wilfrid Rall, with the first multicompartmental model using cable theory.

== Major topics ==
Research in computational neuroscience can be roughly categorized into several lines of inquiry. Most computational neuroscientists collaborate closely with experimentalists in analyzing novel data and synthesizing new models of biological phenomena.

=== Single-neuron modeling ===
Even a single neuron has complex biophysical characteristics and can perform computations (e.g.). The original Hodgkin-Huxley's model included a fast sodium current, a delayed-rectifier potassium current, and a leak current.Though successful in predicting the timing and qualitative features of the action potential, it nevertheless failed to predict a number of important features such as adaptation and shunting. Scientists now believe that there are a wide variety of voltage-sensitive currents, and the implications of the differing dynamics, modulations, and sensitivity of these currents is an important topic of computational neuroscience.

The computational functions of complex dendrites are also under intense investigation. There is a large body of literature regarding how different currents interact with geometric properties of neurons.

There are many software packages, such as GENESIS and NEURON, that allow rapid and systematic in silico modeling of realistic neurons. Blue Brain, a project founded by Henry Markram from the École Polytechnique Fédérale de Lausanne, aims to construct a biophysically detailed simulation of a cortical column on the Blue Gene supercomputer.

Modeling the richness of biophysical properties on the single-neuron scale can supply mechanisms that serve as the building blocks for network dynamics. However, detailed neuron descriptions are computationally expensive and this computing cost can limit the pursuit of realistic network investigations, where many neurons need to be simulated. As a result, researchers that study large neural circuits typically represent each neuron and synapse with an artificially simple model, ignoring much of the biological detail. Hence there is a drive to produce simplified neuron models that can retain significant biological fidelity at a low computational overhead. Algorithms have been developed to produce faithful, faster running, simplified surrogate neuron models from computationally expensive, detailed neuron models.

=== Modeling Neuron-glia interactions ===
Glial cells participate significantly in the regulation of neuronal activity at both the cellular and the network level. Modeling this interaction allows to clarify the potassium cycle, so important for maintaining homeostasis and to prevent epileptic seizures. Modeling reveals the role of glial protrusions that can penetrate in some cases the synaptic cleft to interfere with the synaptic transmission and thus control synaptic communication.

=== Development, axonal patterning, and guidance ===
Computational neuroscience aims to address a wide array of questions, including: How do axons and dendrites form during development? How do axons know where to target and how to reach these targets? How do neurons migrate to the proper position in the central and peripheral systems? How do synapses form? We know from molecular biology that distinct parts of the nervous system release distinct chemical cues, from growth factors to hormones that modulate and influence the growth and development of functional connections between neurons.

Theoretical investigations into the formation and patterning of synaptic connection and morphology are still nascent. One hypothesis that has recently garnered some attention is the minimal wiring hypothesis, which postulates that the formation of axons and dendrites effectively minimizes resource allocation while maintaining maximal information storage.

=== Sensory processing ===
Early models on sensory processing understood within a theoretical framework are credited to Horace Barlow. Somewhat similar to the minimal wiring hypothesis described in the preceding section, Barlow understood the processing of the early sensory systems to be a form of efficient coding, where the neurons encoded information which minimized the number of spikes. Experimental and computational work have since supported this hypothesis in one form or another. For the example of visual processing, efficient coding is manifested in the forms of efficient spatial coding, color coding, temporal/motion coding, stereo coding, and combinations of them.

Further along the visual pathway, even the efficiently coded visual information is too much for the capacity of the information bottleneck, the visual attentional bottleneck. A subsequent theory, V1 Saliency Hypothesis (V1SH), has been developed on exogenous attentional selection of a fraction of visual input for further processing, guided by a bottom-up saliency map in the primary visual cortex.

Current research in sensory processing is divided among a biophysical modeling of different subsystems and a more theoretical modeling of perception. Current models of perception have suggested that the brain performs some form of Bayesian inference and integration of different sensory information in generating our perception of the physical world.

=== Motor control ===
Many models of the way the brain controls movement have been developed. This includes models of processing in the brain such as the cerebellum's role for error correction, skill learning in motor cortex and the basal ganglia, or the control of the vestibulo ocular reflex. This also includes many normative models, such as those of the Bayesian or optimal control flavor which are built on the idea that the brain efficiently solves its problems.

=== Memory and synaptic plasticity ===
Earlier models of memory are primarily based on the postulates of Hebbian learning. Biologically relevant models such as Hopfield net have been developed to address the properties of associative (also known as "content-addressable") style of memory that occur in biological systems. These attempts are primarily focusing on the formation of medium- and long-term memory, localizing in the hippocampus.

One of the major problems in neurophysiological memory is how it is maintained and changed through multiple time scales. Unstable synapses are easy to train but also prone to stochastic disruption. Stable synapses forget less easily, but they are also harder to consolidate. It is likely that computational tools will contribute greatly to our understanding of how synapses function and change in relation to external stimulus in the coming decades.

=== Behaviors of networks ===
Biological neurons are connected to each other in a complex, recurrent fashion. These connections are, unlike most artificial neural networks, sparse and usually specific. It is not known how information is transmitted through such sparsely connected networks, although specific areas of the brain, such as the visual cortex, are understood in some detail. It is also unknown what the computational functions of these specific connectivity patterns are, if any.

The interactions of neurons in a small network can be often reduced to simple models such as the Ising model. The statistical mechanics of such simple systems are well-characterized theoretically. Some recent evidence suggests that dynamics of arbitrary neuronal networks can be reduced to pairwise interactions. It is not known, however, whether such descriptive dynamics impart any important computational function. With the emergence of two-photon microscopy and calcium imaging, we now have powerful experimental methods with which to test the new theories regarding neuronal networks.

In some cases the complex interactions between inhibitory and excitatory neurons can be simplified using mean-field theory, which gives rise to the population model of neural networks. While many neurotheorists prefer such models with reduced complexity, others argue that uncovering structural-functional relations depends on including as much neuronal and network structure as possible. Models of this type are typically built in large simulation platforms like GENESIS or NEURON. There have been some attempts to provide unified methods that bridge and integrate these levels of complexity.

=== Visual attention, identification, and categorization ===
Visual attention can be described as a set of mechanisms that limit some processing to a subset of incoming stimuli. Attentional mechanisms shape what we see and what we can act upon. They allow for concurrent selection of some (preferably, relevant) information and inhibition of other information. In order to have a more concrete specification of the mechanism underlying visual attention and the binding of features, a number of computational models have been proposed aiming to explain psychophysical findings. In general, all models postulate the existence of a saliency or priority map for registering the potentially interesting areas of the retinal input, and a gating mechanism for reducing the amount of incoming visual information, so that the limited computational resources of the brain can handle it. An example theory that is being extensively tested behaviorally and physiologically is the V1 Saliency Hypothesis that a bottom-up saliency map is created in the primary visual cortex to guide attention exogenously. Computational neuroscience provides a mathematical framework for studying the mechanisms involved in brain function and allows complete simulation and prediction of neuropsychological syndromes.

=== Cognition, discrimination, and learning ===
Computational studies of higher cognitive functions use different types of evidence, including behavioral data, brain imaging, electrophysiological recordings, and perturbation experiments in human and other animals. The frontal lobe and parietal lobe function as integrators of information from multiple sensory modalities. There are some tentative ideas regarding how simple mutually inhibitory functional circuits in these areas may carry out biologically relevant computation.

More recent work uses task-optimized artificial neural networks as models of neural computation. These models can be evaluated by comparing their behavior and internal representations with neural and behavioral data, and by testing how changes in architecture, objective functions, or learning rules affect those correspondences. Such comparisons concern functional or computational correspondences and do not, by themselves, establish identical biological implementation.

The brain seems to be able to discriminate and adapt particularly well in certain contexts. For instance, human beings seem to have an enormous capacity for memorizing and recognizing faces. One of the key goals of computational neuroscience is to dissect how biological systems carry out these complex computations efficiently and potentially replicate these processes in building intelligent machines.

The brain's large-scale organizational principles are illuminated by many fields, including biology, psychology, and clinical practice. Integrative neuroscience attempts to consolidate these observations through unified descriptive models and databases of behavioral measures and recordings. These are the bases for some quantitative modeling of large-scale brain activity.

The Computational Representational Understanding of Mind (CRUM) is another attempt at modeling human cognition through simulated processes like acquired rule-based systems in decision making and the manipulation of visual representations in decision making.

=== Consciousness ===
One of the ultimate goals of psychology/neuroscience is to be able to explain the everyday experience of conscious life. Francis Crick, Giulio Tononi and Christof Koch made some attempts to formulate consistent frameworks for future work in neural correlates of consciousness (NCC), though much of the work in this field remains speculative.

=== Computational clinical neuroscience ===
Computational clinical neuroscience is a field that brings together experts in neuroscience, neurology, psychiatry, decision sciences and computational modeling to quantitatively define and investigate problems in neurological and psychiatric diseases, and to train scientists and clinicians that wish to apply these models to diagnosis and treatment.

=== Predictive computational neuroscience ===
Predictive computational neuroscience is a recent field that combines signal processing, neuroscience, clinical data and machine learning to predict the brain during coma or anesthesia. For example, it is possible to anticipate deep brain states using the EEG signal. These states can be used to anticipate hypnotic concentration to administrate to the patient.

=== Computational Psychiatry ===
Computational psychiatry was originally conceived in the late-2000s as the application of computational models to psychiatric disorders. It quickly developed throughout the 2010s with research into schizophrenia, addiction, and major depression among other disorders. There were also attempts to develop computationally inspired diagnostic criteria via the subfield of computational nosology. More recent work seeks to apply Bayesian models of cognition to explain the symptomatology and phenomenology of psychiatric disorders.

== Technology ==
=== Neuromorphic computing ===
A neuromorphic computer/chip is any device that uses physical artificial neurons (made from silicon) to do computations (See: neuromorphic computing, physical neural network). One of the advantages of using a physical model computer such as this is that it takes the computational load of the processor (in the sense that the structural and some of the functional elements don't have to be programmed since they are in hardware). In recent times, neuromorphic technology has been used to build supercomputers which are used in international neuroscience collaborations. Examples include the Human Brain Project SpiNNaker supercomputer and the BrainScaleS computer.

== Software ==
- AnimatLab
- Blue Brain Project
- Brian (software)
- Caret (software)
- GENESIS (software)
- NEST (software)
- Neuron (software)
- Lead-DBS
- Vaa3D

== See also ==
- Action potential
- Biological neuron models
- Bayesian brain
- Brain simulation
- Computational anatomy
- Connectomics
- Differentiable programming
- Electrophysiology
- FitzHugh–Nagumo model
- Goldman equation
- Hodgkin–Huxley model
- Information theory
- Mathematical model
- Nonlinear dynamics
- Neural coding
- Neural decoding
- Neural oscillation
- Neuroinformatics
- Neuromimetic intelligence
- Neuroplasticity
- Neurophysiology
- Systems neuroscience
- Theoretical biology
- Theta model
- Walter Pitts

== Bibliography ==
- Chklovskii DB (2004). "Synaptic connectivity and neuronal morphology: two sides of the same coin". Neuron. 43 (5): 609–17. doi:10.1016/j.neuron.2004.08.012. PMID 15339643. S2CID 16217065.
- Sejnowski, Terrence J.; Churchland, Patricia Smith (1992). The computational brain. Cambridge, Mass: MIT Press. ISBN 978-0-262-03188-2.
- Gerstner, W.; Kistler, W.; Naud, R.; Paninski, L. (2014). Neuronal Dynamics. Cambridge, UK: Cambridge University Press. ISBN 978-1-107-44761-5.
- Dayan P.; Abbott, L. F. (2001). Theoretical neuroscience: computational and mathematical modeling of neural systems. Cambridge, Mass: MIT Press. ISBN 978-0-262-04199-7.
- Eliasmith, Chris; Anderson, Charles H. (2003). Neural engineering: Representation, computation, and dynamics in neurobiological systems. Cambridge, Mass: MIT Press. ISBN 978-0-262-05071-5.
- Hodgkin AL, Huxley AF (28 August 1952). "A quantitative description of membrane current and its application to conduction and excitation in nerve". J. Physiol. 117 (4): 500–44. doi:10.1113/jphysiol.1952.sp004764. PMC 1392413. PMID 12991237.
- William Bialek; Rieke, Fred; David Warland; Rob de Ruyter van Steveninck (1999). Spikes: exploring the neural code. Cambridge, Mass: MIT. ISBN 978-0-262-68108-7.
- Schutter, Erik de (2001). Computational neuroscience: realistic modeling for experimentalists. Boca Raton: CRC. ISBN 978-0-8493-2068-2.
- Sejnowski, Terrence J.; Hemmen, J. L. van (2006). 23 problems in systems neuroscience. Oxford [Oxfordshire]: Oxford University Press. ISBN 978-0-19-514822-0.
- Michael A. Arbib; Shun-ichi Amari; Prudence H. Arbib (2002). The Handbook of Brain Theory and Neural Networks. Cambridge, Massachusetts: The MIT Press. ISBN 978-0-262-01197-6.
- Zhaoping, Li (2014). Understanding vision: theory, models, and data. Oxford, UK: Oxford University Press. ISBN 978-0-19-956466-8.

== See also ==
=== Software ===
- BRIAN, a Python based simulator
- Budapest Reference Connectome, web based 3D visualization tool to browse connections in the human brain
- Emergent, neural simulation software.
- GENESIS, a general neural simulation system.
- NEST is a simulator for spiking neural network models that focuses on the dynamics, size and structure of neural systems rather than on the exact morphology of individual neurons.
