= Ann Stuart (academic administrator) =

Dr. Ann Stuart is the former chancellor and president of Texas Woman's University. She came to TWU as the university's first chancellor. She was the fourth woman president, serving fourteen years from December 1, 1999, until her retirement on May 1, 2014. Before TWU, she was president of Rensselaer at Hartford, a graduate school associated with Rensselaer Polytechnic Institute in Troy, New York.

Dr. Stuart previously served as provost and vice president for academic affairs at Alma College in Michigan; dean of the School of Arts and Sciences at East Stroudsburg University in Pennsylvania; and in several capacities at the University of Evansville in Indiana. She earned her undergraduate degree in education from the University of Florida; her master's degree in English from the University of Kentucky; and her doctorate in English from Southern Illinois University.
