= Ann Stuart (scientist) =

American educator and scientist (born 20th century)

Ann Elizabeth Stuart (born 20th century) is an American neurophysiologist and former professor of neurophysiology at the University of North Carolina, Chapel Hill.

Raised in Pennsylvania with an interest in physiology, her involvement in her school's science fair changed her focus to other forms of physiological and disease-based research. A lecture by Nobel Prize winner Haldan Keffer Hartline altered her life again and directed her to vision research, which she wanted to carry out at the Marine Biological Laboratory that Hartline did.

She did so while working as a professor at Harvard University and later UNC Chapel Hill. Her work with vision would result in a computer program called Neurons In Action she developed with her husband that simulates the electrical functionality of neurons. This training simulation would end up being used in classrooms internationally.

== Childhood and education ==
Born to Grace Snyder Stuart and Allan Stuart and raised in Pennsylvania, Stuart had an interest in physiology from a young age, wanting to become a doctor ever since her grandmother gifted her a microscope. She remembered being allowed to visit the Harrisburg hospital to watch the head of medical photography, Frances Goldsborough, work. She went on to attend Camp Hill High School. Her focus changed, however, when she participated in her senior grade science fair, where she presented an experiment titled "Development and Investigation of a Lysozyme Resistant Mutant of Bacillus Megatherium". The project had been formed through her correspondence with microbiologist Robert Acker, who also invited her to do research in his lab the following summer. Stuart became the grand champion of the science fair and was moved up to present a different experiment at the International Science and Engineering Fair. Her experiment there was on how bacterial infection of the mouth gains antibiotic resistance, which won her five awards, including the top award possible from the American Dental Association.

Afterwards, Stuart attended Swarthmore College as an undergraduate for a degree in zoology. While there, two of her classmates were children of Nobel Prize winner Haldan Keffer Hartline; they convinced their father to give a lecture at the college. The speech inspired her to work at the Marine Biological Laboratory (MBL) where Hartline had, along with changing her research focus specifically onto the physiology of vision. She later decided to study barnacles because their large photoreceptors made them a perfect model organism for the subject. After completing her undergraduate degree, she went on to earn a Ph.D. from Yale University and then conducted a postdoctoral fellowship at two university departments, the neurobiology department at Harvard University and the physiology department at UCLA.

== Career ==
After graduating from university, Stuart visited the MBL in 1965 because of Hartline's influence. She then became an assistant professor at Harvard University in 1973, but was so impressed by the MBL that she began conducting her research there during the summer each year beginning that same year. She went on to become an associate professor at Harvard. After marrying, she moved her professorship to UNC Chapel Hill in 1979, but kept conducting her summer trips to the MBL and eventually also began teaching summer courses there, specifically the neurophysiology and the Summer Program in Neuroscience, Excellence and Success (SPINES) courses. She and her husband later developed a learning tool at the MBL called Neurons In Action that would go on to be used in courses internationally. The software allows for the simulation of neuronal activity and can be used to observe how different electrical signals are affected by diseases such as multiple sclerosis. Made on a CD-ROM, it allows for students to test voltage and current effect on neurons that mimics a laboratory experiment scenario.

== Awards and honors ==
In December 2007, she was given the Educator of the Year award by UNC's Faculty for Undergraduate Neuroscience for her work on the Neurons In Action software.

== Personal life ==
While working at the MBL in 1974, Stuart met John Wilson Moore, a neurophysiology professor at Duke University, and they married in 1978. They had a son in 1983 named Jonathan Stuart-Moore. The couple maintained a cottage at Woods Hole near the MBL for summer use. To help support the childcare needed for the scientists at the MBL, she helped created the Satellite Club children's camp in 1988. Later, she and her husband made The Ann E. Stuart and John W. Moore Endowed Fund for Children's Programs to help support the continuation of both children's camps. Starting when her son Jonathan was five years old, Stuart practiced playing glass music with him, using glass harps. They began publicly performing when he turned eleven and were a duo performance in the 1997 Glass Music International Festival, where they were featured on an episode of Scientific American Frontiers. Stuart retired in 2013.

== Bibliography ==
- —; Moore, John W. (2007). Neurons in Action 2: Tutorials and Simulations Using NEURON. Sinauer Associates. ISBN 9781605353913.
- —; Moore, John W. (2000). Neurons in Action: Computer Simulations with NeuroLab. Sinauer Associates. p. 93. ISBN 9780878935376.
