= John Wilson Moore =

American biophysicist (1920–2019)

- Born: November 1, 1920; Winston-Salem, North Carolina, US
- Died: March 30, 2019 (aged 98)
- Education: Davidson College (B.S., 1941)
- Known for: Tetrodotoxin, NEURON
- Spouse: Ann Elizabeth Stuart (1943–)
- Scientific career
- Fields: Biophysics, Neuroscience, Computational Neuroscience, Physics
- Workplaces: Duke University (1961–); NIH (1954–1961); Naval Medical Research Institute (1950–1954); Medical College of Virginia (1946–1950); RCA (1945–1946); University of Virginia (1941–1945)

John Wilson Moore (November 1, 1920 – March 30, 2019) was an American biophysicist who pioneered the emergent power of computers, beginning in the 1950s, to reveal how signals are generated, integrated, and then travel in neurons. He is well known for his discovery (with Toshio Narahashi), that the puffer fish toxin tetrodotoxin causes death by blocking the sodium ion channels that are responsible for nerve activity. Moore was emeritus professor of Neurobiology at Duke University Medical School where he had been a member of the faculty since 1961. Moore's NEURON simulator software, begun with and now carried forward by Michael Hines, is used worldwide. Moore received the Cole Award of the Biophysical Society in 1981.

== Early life and education ==
Moore was born in November 1920 in Winston-Salem, North Carolina, where his father was superintendent of the Winston-Salem public schools. He studied physics at Davidson College and entered a graduate program in physics at the University of Virginia in 1941. The day after Pearl Harbor he suddenly discovered he had been working on the project of developing a centrifuge to separate isotopes of uranium for the Manhattan Project. A second war project assignment, making an automated director for ships' guns using radar, awakened his interest in feedback systems that ultimately shaped his professional undertakings.

== Career ==
=== Using the voltage clamp to discover the action of neurotoxins ===
His first appointment was at RCA where he was heavily influenced by Art Vance, who among other inventions designed the operational amplifier that Moore later introduced into neurophysiology equipment. As his interests began to turn towards applying physics to biological problems, he joined the faculty at the Medical College of Virginia, and then the lab of Kenneth Stewart Cole, at the Naval Medical Research Institute and later the NIH. Moore became one of the earliest adopters of the voltage clamp technique, which Cole had invented and had shown to Alan Hodgkin and Andrew Huxley who had used it to solve the problem of the action potential. Moving to Duke in 1961, Moore improved the voltage clamp, attracting collaborators from different universities and countries who brought him neurotoxins such as tetrodotoxin and red tide toxin to test on nerve axons. Much of this work was carried out on squid giant axons at the Marine Biological Laboratory in Woods Hole, MA, where he spent summers until his death.

=== Bringing the power of computers into neurobiology ===
In the 1980s Moore turned his attention to using the evolving power of computers for two big problems: simulating experimental results, and predicting how action potentials travel in neurons of complex geometry. He hired Michael Hines, a mathematician, to collaborate in developing a neuronal simulator they named NEURON. Using NEURON he pioneered the concept of working back and forth between simulations and actual experiments, using simulations to predict the outcome of experiments on biological preparations, and then carrying out the experiment to test the validity of the parameters entered into the simulations. Hines took over the further evolution of NEURON while Moore collaborated with his wife, neurobiologist Ann Stuart, to make the educational tool Neurons in Action based on NEURON. Neurons in Action has been used widely to convey basic principles of neurophysiology, for example by Tibetan monks and nuns of the Dalai Lama in exile in Dharamsala, India, and in a course of the International Brain Research Organization held annually for faculty in different African countries.

== Personal life ==
Moore had two sons and a daughter and seven grandchildren from his first marriage to Natalie Bayless in 1946. In 1978 he married Ann E. Stuart with whom he had one son, Jonathan Stuart-Moore, who has assisted in the development of Neurons in Action.

Moore's autobiography is available at the Society for Neuroscience website. He died in March 2019 at the age of 98.
