= Spaun (Semantic Pointer Architecture Unified Network) =

Brain simulation architecture

Spaun ("Semantic Pointer Architecture Unified Network") is a cognitive architecture pioneered by Chris Eliasmith of the University of Waterloo Centre for Theoretical Neuroscience. It consists of 2.5 million simulated neurons organized into subsystems that resemble specific brain regions, such as the prefrontal cortex, basal ganglia, and thalamus. It can recognize numbers, remember them, figure out numeric sequences, and even write them down with a robotic arm. It is implemented using Nengo.
