= Trion (neural networks) =

Trion is a basic unit of the neural network model of cortical organization called trion model. This unit represents a highly structured and interconnected aggregate of about a hundred of neurons with the overall diameter of about 0.7 mm. Each trion has three levels of firing activity, and thus a cluster of trions can produce a complex firing pattern which changes rapidly (millisecond scale) according to probabilistic (Monte Carlo) rules.
