= Theoretical neuromorphology =

Theoretical neuromorphology is the science of using morphology to mathematically describe the shape and the connectivity in the nervous system.

== History ==
The rational study of shapes has been long to form. In the major progresses made during the last century, it is important to differentiate morphogenesis (the way forms are made) and morphology (realized forms).

=== Morphogenesis ===
Important conceptual changes about forms came from d'Arcy Thompson’s essay (1917) dealing with forms in nature. These were not considered as static but as the result of morphogenetic factors. Not knowable in its intimate nature, form is defined as the simple result of forces. Thom (1974), founder of the "catastrophe theory" acknowledged what he owed to this work. A series of various branches of non-linear mathematics catastrophe theory, the fractal theory, the theory of "dissipative structures", the chaos theory have led to what Boutot (1993) called "the morphologic revolution", which has deeply modified the conception of forms in space. Theoretical neuromorphology discards morphogenesis (the way forms have been made) to limit its purpose to realised forms.

=== Neuromorphology ===
In spite of some results, space and shapes were often not considered as susceptible of bringing information on the nervous system functioning. Neuromorphology yet had been intensively studied after the discovery of the Golgi method allowing to see entire neurons. This gave rise to an abundant literature, with descriptions and figures. This allowed Ramon y Cajal (1911) to found definitely the "neuron theory" (the brain is constituted of separate cells that communicate together) and to formulate the law of "dynamic polarization" (axonalwards). With others, he pointed out the variety of patterns of neurons depending on particular cerebral places and already emitted hypotheses on the roles that could be played by particular forms. Several attempts have been made later. One step has been the work of Mannen (1960) on closed and open nuclei reinsisting on dendritic morphology. This was followed by several papers of Ramon-Moliner defining types of neurons according to their dendritic arborisations.

=== Formalisation ===
An approach of natural forms was proposed by Stevens (1974) who tried to rationally make classification of forms and to find their specific properties and advantages in terms of directness or economy of ways. Since almost one century, an important corpus of theoretical tools, still poorly exploited, has revealed to be very helpful for the understanding of the nervous system. These tools, generally, may be classified as «logical » or more narrowly as « logico-mathematical ». As will be seen, the most useful for the theoretical neuromorphology, along with geometry for metrical parameters, are the set theory, the system theory, the graph theory.

=== General morphology ===
The classic traditional forms were emanating from and could be described by using Euclidean geometry for instance in relation to the cartesian triedre (one perpendicular axe for three "dimensions"). These forms can have material realisations (cubes, balls..). Many natural objects however cannot be satisfactorily described using the Euclidean geometry. Many of them are for instance fractals (Mandelbrot, 1983), because they are branched, have holes, or are too anfractuous, etc.. In their case the three dimensions are no more linked linearly. This is particularly true for surfaces and volumes. As already stressed by Stevens (1974) some morphological pattern may offer precise advantages. An example can be given from two extremes where the surface of objects is fundamental. The surface is the place where objects exchange between an inside and an outside. In the case where the more advantageous is to have the minimal exchange, the chosen shape is generally the ovoid (such are eggs, grains, fruits, cetaceans, etc. with the sphere as the perfect limit), which for a given volume limits the surface to its minimum. When the exchange is fundamental important surface is necessary an aminimal material cost. The binary branching increases considerably the surface without increasing much the volume of matter. This is the case for vegetal trees and vascular, pulmonary, urinary systems. The nervous system may be seen as a system of exchanges between emitting and receiving binary arborizations, offering a huge combinatorial range.

=== Identification and classification ===
One problem of neuromorphology is because it has not to describe one object, the brain, but an average brain. This justifies an extensive use of statistics.

Tyner (1975) and Rowe and Stone (1977) have analysed the conceptual bases to be respected in the process of neuronal classification. They insisted on the necessity of separating classification and identification.

Classifications must be based on multifactorial techniques and to be hierarchical (following the bicentennial animal taxonomy). When many namings or identifications were done on the characteristics of the soma, it appeared clear that only a quantitative study of complete dendritic arborisations was able to offer a means for a neutral neuronal taxonomy. A particular kind of a group of neuron in a localized part of the brain in one animal species is called a neuronal species. When neurons of about the same morphology is observed at the same place in another animal species, it is a neuronal genus. There are also neuronal families and so on. For example, spiny neurons of the striatum of macaque are one species. Along with that of man and/or other species they form a genus. Statistical comparisons allow to analyse what remained the same or what has changed in evolution.

Starting from objectively defined neurons, it became possible to constitute neuronal sets.

=== Neuronal sets ===
==== Sets ====
«The theory of set underlies virtually every branch of mathematics» (Kahn, 1995). Great changes in the way of analysing and reasoning have been brought by set theory. This starts from simple concepts. For instance «a set is a collection of elements » (Kahn, 1995) which is intuitive and has not to be demonstrated. The elements have in common to be members of the set. A particular set is defined by the common properties of its elements. This raises problems of similarities and finally of typology and classification.

==== Neuronal sets ====
Neuronal sets may be sets of entire neurons or of neuronal parts.

=== Neuronal systems ===
Our ability to think, react and remember relies on the function of the nervous system. We cannot understand the human brain without first elucidating the properties and function of its main unit elements, the neurons.

These are complex and specialized cells. However, the improved understanding of cellular evolution achieved over the last several years has revealed that even the most sophisticated and unique properties of nerve cells represent an adaptation of basic functions observed in all eukaryotic cells, including unicellular organisms. Thus, cellular neurobiology has become an important chapter of cell biology. Studies of neurons greatly capitalize on progress in fundamental cell biology. Conversely, research on specialized features of neurons is producing major fall-outs in other areas of biology. Projects of cellular neurobiology in the department focus on mechanisms in membrane traffic at the synapse, on the development and maintenance of cell polarity and on the mechanisms responsible for the heterogeneous distribution of organelles and macromolecules within the neuronal cytoplasm. Formation and plasticity of synapses are also investigated. In the tradition of the department, questions in these fields are approached in a multidisciplinary fashion using genetics, protein and lipid biochemistry, molecular biology and state of the art light and electron microscopy imaging techniques. Experimental systems include mouse models, cultured neurons, large model synapses, isolated synaptic preparations and cell free systems. Special emphasis is placed on interfaces between this basic research and disease.
