= QualNet =

QualNet is a commercial network simulation tool owned by Keysight Technologies (formerly Scalable Network Technologies).

QualNet uses parallel discrete event simulation technology to model various layers of the network stack including the physical layer of wireless radios. QualNet simulations may be customized to include terrain data, antenna patterns, experimental or specialized network protocols (ex mesh networking), and mobility (nodes move during the simulation). Alternatives to QualNet include NS-2 and OPNET. QualNet was used since the early 2000s to research and develop wireless communication technologies.

== See also ==
- Discrete Event Simulation
- Network simulation
