= List of members of the National Academy of Sciences (systems neuroscience) =

This list is a subsection of the List of members of the National Academy of Sciences, which includes members and international members of the United States National Academy of Sciences, living and deceased, each affiliated with one of the academy's disciplinary sections. Members are listed under their primary section, and each entry gives the person's name, primary institution, and election year. For deceased members, the year of death is noted.

== Systems neuroscience ==
Name	Institution	Year
Larry Abbott	Columbia University	2014
Huda Akil	University of Michigan	2011
Thomas D. Albright	Salk Institute for Biological Studies	2008
Richard A. Andersen	California Institute of Technology	2005
Dora E. Angelaki	New York University	2014
Carol A. Barnes	University of Arizona	2018
Amy J. Bastian	Kennedy Krieger Institute	2023
Lloyd M. Beidler (died 2003)	Florida State University	1974
Ursula Bellugi (died 2022)	Salk Institute for Biological Studies	2007
Emilio Bizzi	Massachusetts Institute of Technology	1986
Edward S. Boyden	Massachusetts Institute of Technology	2019
Emery Neal Brown	Massachusetts Institute of Technology	2014
Elizabeth A. Buffalo	University of Washington School of Medicine	2022
Theodore H. Bullock (died 2005)	University of California, San Diego	1963
Jan Bureš (died 2012)	Czech Academy of Sciences	1995
György Buzsáki	New York University Langone Medical Center	2017
Edward M. Callaway	Salk Institute for Biological Studies	2019
Edward F. Chang	University of California, San Francisco	2025
Leon N. Cooper (died 2024)	Brown University	1975
W. Maxwell Cowan (died 2002)	Howard Hughes Medical Institute	1981
Karl Deisseroth	Stanford University	2012
Winfried Denk	Max Planck Institute for Biological Intelligence	2013
Robert Desimone	Massachusetts Institute of Technology	1999
John E. Dowling	Harvard University	1976
Adrienne Fairhall	University of Washington	2025
Marla B. Feller	University of California, Berkeley	2023
Fred H. Gage	Salk Institute for Biological Studies	2003
Charles D. Gilbert	The Rockefeller University	2006
Donald A. Glaser (died 2013)	University of California, Berkeley	1962
Michael E. Goldberg	Columbia University	2011
Patricia S. Goldman-Rakic (died 2003)	Yale School of Medicine	1990
Ann M. Graybiel	Massachusetts Institute of Technology	1988
William T. Greenough (died 2013)	University of Illinois Urbana-Champaign	1992
Donald R. Griffin (died 2003)	Rockefeller University	1960
Charles G. Gross (died 2019)	Princeton University	1998
Riitta Hari	Aalto University	2004
Osamu Hayaishi (died 2015)	Osaka Bioscience Institute	1972
Stephen F. Heinemann (died 2014)	Salk Institute for Biological Studies	1992
David H. Hubel (died 2013)	Harvard Medical School	1971
Masao Ito (died 2018)	RIKEN	2007
Edward G. Jones (died 2011)	University of California, Davis	2004
Jon H. Kaas	Vanderbilt University	2000
Harvey J. Karten (died 2024)	University of California, San Diego	2015
Eric I. Knudsen	Stanford University School of Medicine	2002
Masakazu Konishi (died 2020)	California Institute of Technology	1985
Nancy J. Kopell	Boston University	1996
Edward A. Kravitz (died 2025)	Harvard Medical School	1984
John I. Lacey (died 2004)	Wright State University	1980
Joseph E. LeDoux	New York University	2013
Stephen G. Lisberger	Duke University School of Medicine	2022
Margaret S. Livingstone	Harvard Medical School	2020
Nikos K. Logothetis	Max Planck Institute for Biological Cybernetics	2009
John H.R. Maunsell	The University of Chicago	2021
Helen S. Mayberg	Icahn School of Medicine at Mount Sinai	2022
Bruce S. McEwen (died 2020)	The Rockefeller University	1997
James L. McGaugh	University of California, Irvine	1989
Michael M. Merzenich	Posit Science Corporation	1999
Brenda Milner	McGill University	1976
Mortimer Mishkin (died 2021)	National Institutes of Health	1984
Richard Mooney	Duke University	2024
Tirin Moore	Stanford University School of Medicine	2021
Richard G. M. Morris	University of Edinburgh	2020
Edvard Ingjald Moser	Norwegian University of Science and Technology	2014
May-Britt Moser	Norwegian University of Science and Technology	2014
Vernon B. Mountcastle (died 2015)	Johns Hopkins University	1966
Tony Movshon	New York University	2008
William D. Neff (died 2002)	Indiana University	1964
Eric J. Nestler	Icahn School of Medicine at Mount Sinai	2025
William T. Newsome	Stanford University	2000
Fernando Nottebohm	The Rockefeller University	1988
John O’Keefe	University College London	2016
Dominick P. Purpura (died 2019)	Albert Einstein College of Medicine	1983
Marcus E. Raichle	Washington University in St. Louis	1996
Jennifer L. Raymond	Stanford University	2024
Lorrin A. Riggs (died 2008)	Brown University	1961
Giacomo Rizzolatti	University of Parma	2012
Ranulfo Romo	El Colegio Nacional	2005
Walter A. Rosenblith (died 2002)	Massachusetts Institute of Technology	1976
Peter H. Schiller	Massachusetts Institute of Technology	2007
Terrence J. Sejnowski	Salk Institute for Biological Studies	2010
Michael N. Shadlen	Columbia University	2023
Wolf Singer	Ernst Strungmann Institute for Neuroscience	2017
James M. Sprague (died 2002)	University of Pennsylvania	1984
Larry R. Squire	University of California, San Diego	1993
Peter L. Strick	University of Pittsburgh	2012
Michael P. Stryker	University of California, San Francisco	2009
Nobuo Suga	Washington University in St. Louis	1998
Larry W. Swanson	University of Southern California	2010
Owsei Temkin (died 2002)	Johns Hopkins University	1978
Richard F. Thompson (died 2014)	University of Southern California	1977
Susumu Tonegawa (died 2026)	Massachusetts Institute of Technology	1986
Doris Y. Tsao	University of California, Berkeley	2020
Leslie G. Ungerleider (died 2020)	National Institutes of Health	2000
David C. Van Essen	Washington University in St. Louis	2017
Lawrence Weiskrantz (died 2018)	University of Oxford	1987
Torsten N. Wiesel	The Rockefeller University	1980
Robert H. Wurtz	National Institutes of Health	1988
