= Karl Spencer Lashley Award =

The Karl Spencer Lashley Award is awarded by the American Philosophical Society as a recognition of research on the integrative neuroscience of behavior. The award was established in 1957 by a gift from Dr. Karl Spencer Lashley.

== Recipients ==
- 2025 Gilles Laurent
- 2024 Margaret Livingstone
- 2023 Silvia Arber
- 2022 Nicholas Spitzer
- 2021 Patricia K. Kuhl «in recognition of her fundamental discoveries concerning how human infants acquire language, and how brain structure and activity changes during language learning in both monolingual and bilingual children»
- 2020 Winrich Freiwald and Doris Tsao - "In recognition of their ground-breaking discoveries of primate cortical areas that selectively encode visual information about faces, the computational principles underlying face encoding in these areas, and the implications of these discoveries for social cognition."
- 2019 Wolfram Schultz
- 2018 Catherine Dulac - "In recognition of her incisive studies of the molecular and circuit basis of instinctive behaviors mediated through olfactory systems in the mammalian brain"
- 2017 Michael Shadlen - "In recognition of his pioneering experimental and theoretical studies of decision-making, identifying neural mechanisms that accumulate and convert sensory information toward behavioral choices"
- 2016 Charles G. Gross - "In recognition of his pioneering studies of the neurophysiology of higher visual functions and the neural basis of face recognition and object perception"
- 2015 David W. Tank - "In recognition of his pioneering application of intracellular recording and two-photon microscopy in awake animals, which has revealed new insights into the neural circuits underlying cognition"
- 2014 Edvard and May-Britt Moser - "In recognition of their discovery of grid cells in entorhinal cortex, and their pioneering physiological studies of hippocampus, which have transformed understanding of the neural computations underlying spatial memory"
- 2013 J. Anthony Movshon - "In recognition of his studies of how neurons in the cerebral cortex process visual information and how cortical information processing enables seeing"
- 2012 Eve Marder - "In recognition of her comprehensive work with a small nervous system, demonstrating general principles by which neuromodulatory substances reconfigure the operation of neuronal networks"
- 2011 Joseph E. LeDoux - "In recognition of his seminal studies of the neural mechanisms of emotional learning, particularly fear learning and fear memory"
- 2010 William T. Newsome - "In recognition of his pioneering studies of the primate visual system demonstrating the relation between perception and the activity of individual neurons"
- 2009 James L. McGaugh - "In recognition of his comprehensive study of the biological processes that modulate the formation and consolidation of memory"
- 2008 Eric Knudsen - "In recognition of his comprehensive study of visual and auditory perception in the owl and for his elucidation of how the auditory map is calibrated by the visual system during development"
- 2007 Richard F. Thompson - "In recognition of his distinguished contributions to understanding the brain substrates of learning and memory"
- 2006 Jon H. Kaas - "In recognition of his comprehensive analyses of the primate cerebral cortex, its evolution, functional organization, and plastic response to injury"
- 2005 Bruce McEwen - "In recognition of his extensive demonstrations of the role of circulating steroid hormones as regulators of neuroplasticity and behavioral adaption"
- 2004 Masakazu Konishi and Fernando Nottebohm - "In recognition of their fundamental contributions in identifying the organization and function of the avian brain systems for learning and executing birdsong"
- 2003 Horace B. Barlow - "In recognition of his fundamental contributions to understanding how the eye and brain accomplish vision"
- 2002 Jean-Pierre Changeux - "In recognition of his pioneering, comprehensive studies into the fundamental molecular mechanisms underlying interneuronal communication and their role in network formation, learning, and reward"
- 2001 Edward G. Jones - "In recognition of his comprehensive determination of the organization of the thalamus and the basis for the dynamic regulation of cortical excitability"
- 2000 Charles Stevens - "In recognition of his penetrating contributions to synaptic transmission and synaptic plasticity"
- 1999 Michael Merzenich - "In recognition of his original contributions to cortical plasticity"
- 1998 Michael I. Posner and Marcus E. Raichle - "Jointly, for their pioneering contributions to brain imaging"
- 1996 Patricia S. Goldman-Rakic - "For seminal contributions to the current understanding of prefrontal cortex and its role in working memory and for effectively applying insights from basic biological sciences to mental health"
- 1996 Mortimer Mishkin - "For his pioneering analysis of the memory and the perceptual systems of the brain, and his seminal contributions to the understanding of the higher nervous system function"
- 1995 Larry R. Squire - "For his seminal contribution to the delineation of implicit and explicit memory systems in the brain"
- 1994 Robert H. Wurtz - "For brilliant technical innovations in recording the activity of single visual neurons of alert, behaviorally-trained monkeys that made possible salient scientific discoveries relating individual nerve cells to visual perception and to the generation of eye movement"
- 1993 Paul Greengard - "For his pioneering work on the molecular basis of signal transduction and vesicle mobilization in nerve cells"
- 1992 Seymour Kety - "For major contributions to understanding the genetics of schizophrenia and depression, and for developing reliable methods for studying cerebral blood flow which paved the way for PET imaging of brain activity"
- 1991 Sanford L. Palay - "For pioneering the study of the nervous system on the ultrastructural level, for revolutionizing understanding, and especially for his seminal contribution - characterization of the chemical synapse in the central nervous system"
- 1990 Viktor Hamburger - "For pioneering the study of neuroembryology, and especially the landmark contributions to understanding neural cell death, nerve growth factor, and the developmental program for motor behavior"
- 1989 Bela Julesz - "For his illuminating discoveries concerning the human visual capacity, particularly for stereoscopic vision, depth perception, and pattern recognition"
- 1989 Gian Franco Poggio - "For discoveries of visual cortical mechanisms in stereopsis and depth perception which have significantly influenced modern studies of the brain mechanisms in vision"
- 1988 Seymour Benzer - "A pioneer in using genetic techniques to study the genetic code and the transfer of information from DNA to proteins. By a brilliant selection of suitable experimental systems, he has succeeded over the last twenty years in advancing these techniques and applying them to the analysis of development and behavior. These contributions have greatly expanded the power of the genetic approach in neurobiology and fostered a merger between molecular biology and neurobiology that is having profound consequences on every aspect of the field"
- 1987 Louis Sokoloff - "For his elucidation of the physiological and biochemical processes involved in the metabolism of the brain and the application of these discoveries to the measurement of functional activity within that organ"
- 1986 Pasko Rakic - "For his seminal contributions to the field of developmental neurobiology through research on the development of the central nervous system"
- 1985 David Bodian - "In recognition of his fundamental neurobiological studies studies that laid the foundation for the successful development of a vaccine against poliomyelitis. He has continued to make important discoveries in the development and structure of the nervous system"
- 1984 W. Maxwell Cowan - "For his long record of important contributions to understanding the embryological development of the brain"
- 1983 Edward V. Evarts
- 1982 Herbert H. Jasper
- 1981 Eric R. Kandel
- 1980 Curt P. Richter
- 1979 Brenda Milner
- 1978 Victor Percy Whittaker
- 1977 Torsten Nils Wiesel and David Hunter Hubel
- 1976 Roger Wolcott Sperry
- 1975 Paul Weiss
- 1974 Vernon Benjamin Mountcastle
- 1973 Janos Szentagothai
- 1972 Paul D. MacLean
- 1971 Sir Wilfrid Le Gros Clark
- 1970 Horace Winchell Magoun
- 1969 Elizabeth C. Crosby
- 1968 Theodore H. Bullock
- 1967 George H. Bishop
- 1966 Hans-Lukas Teuber
- 1965 Giuseppe Moruzzi
- 1964 Walle H . J. Nauta
- 1963 Alexander Forbes
- 1962 Philip Bard
- 1961 Edgar Douglas Adrian
- 1960 Heinrich Kluver
- 1959 Rafael Lorente de Nó

== See also ==
- List of neuroscience awards
- Kavli Prize
- Golden Brain Award
- Gruber Prize in Neuroscience
- W. Alden Spencer Award
- The Brain Prize
- Mind & Brain Prize
- Ralph W. Gerard Prize in Neuroscience
