= Golden Brain Award =

- Awarded for: Discoveries in vision and brain
- Location: Berkeley, California
- Presented by: Minerva Foundation
- First award: 1985
- Website: Homepage

The Golden Brain Award is an international science award in the field of neuroscience. It is given by the Berkeley-based Minerva Foundation every year since 1985. The foundation specifically aims at fundamental contributions to research in vision and the brain. The Golden Brain is a trophy of a gold-plated model of the human brain attached to a bronze base.

== Selection ==
The Golden Brain Award is open to any person who has made innovative investigations and the resulting influence of those findings on the field of vision and the brain. Preference is given to studies involving higher brain function such as the aspects of behaviour, thought, attention, decision making and rational insight, and cognitive visual system. Special attributes are also considered such as a lack of deserved recognition, which is common in young scientists, and the potential for future important scientific revelations. Formal nominations are made by previous recipients, and final decision is made by the selection board.

== Trophy ==
The Golden Brain is a model of human brain, and the name is given as it is colored with gold. It was originally designed and crafted by Tamia Marg. The brain is a pedestal of ten inches high, held by a spinal cord-like stem that is fixed to a metal base. It is primarily made of bronze that is coated with a 23-carat gold plating at Monsen Plating in Berkeley. The flat base painted by spraying it with an acidic mixture to give it the bluish-green patina. The brain and base were fastened together, and a polished brass circle engraved with the awardee's name is mounted on the trophy. The wooden box for the trophy is made by a furniture maker, Lawrence Gandsey of Oakland. The box is of eastern maple grown (Acer saccharum) in the Appalachians and is held together with splines of mahogany (Swietenia macrophylla) from Honduras, and is finished with a mixture of linseed oil and turpentine.

== Recipients ==
Source: Minerva Foundation

Year	Recipient	Institute	Country
1985	Semir Zeki	University College London	United Kingdom
1986	Gian F. Poggio	The Johns Hopkins School of Medicine, Baltimore	United States
1987	David Sparks	Baylor College of Medicine, Houston, Texas	US
1988	Denis Baylor	Stanford University, Stanford	US
1989	Jeremy Nathans	The Johns Hopkins School of Medicine, Baltimore	US
1990	John M. Allman	California Institute of Technology, Pasadena	US
1991	Robert H. Wurtz	National Eye Institute, Bethesda, Maryland	US
1992	William T. Newsome	Stanford University, Stanford	US
1993	Rudiger von der Heydt	Johns Hopkins School of Medicine, Baltimore	US
1994	Robert Desimone	National Institute of Mental Health, Bethesda, Maryland	US
1995	Antonio R. Damasio	University of Southern California	US
1996	Anne Treisman	Princeton University, New Jersey	US
1997	Claudio Galletti	University of Bologna	Italy
1998	Heinz Wassle	Max Planck Institute for Brain Research, Frankfurt	Germany
1999	Nikos Logothetis	Max-Planck Institute for Biological Cybernetics, Tübingen	Germany
2000	Frederick Miles	National Eye Institute, Bethesda, Maryland	US
2001	David Perrett	University of St. Andrews	Scotland, UK
2002	Wolfram Schultz	University of Cambridge	UK
2003	Karl Friston	University College London	UK
2004	Atsushi Iriki	Tokyo Medical and Dental University	Japan
2005	Markus Meister	Harvard University, Cambridge	US
2006	Raymond Joseph Dolan	University College London	UK
2007	Nancy Kanwisher	Massachusetts Institute of Technology, Cambridge	US
2008	Larry Young	Emory University, Georgia	US
2009	Karl Deisseroth	Stanford University, Stanford	US
2010	Daniel Wolpert	Columbia University, New York City	US
2011	Leslie Ungerleider	National Institute of Mental Health	US
2012	Michael Shadlen	Columbia University, New York City	US
2013	Joseph Anthony Movshon	New York University	US
2014	Doris Tsao	California Institute of Technology	US
2015	Okihide Hikosaka	National Eye Institute	US
2016	Eero Simoncelli	New York University, New York, New York	US
2017	Ken Nakayama	Harvard University	US
2018	Winrich Freiwald	Rockefeller University	US
2019	Michael Goldberg	Columbia University	US
2020	John Maunsell	University of Chicago	US
2021	Tirin Moore	Stanford University	US
2022	Margaret Livingstone	Harvard University	US
2023	Stephen Lisberger	Duke University	US
2024	Sabine Kastner	Princeton University, New Jersey	US
2025	James DiCarlo	Massachusetts Institute of Technology, Cambridge	US

== See also ==
- List of neuroscience awards
- Kavli Prize
- The Brain Prize
- Gruber Prize in Neuroscience
- W. Alden Spencer Award
- Karl Spencer Lashley Award
- The Mind & Brain Prize
- Ralph W. Gerard Prize in Neuroscience
