= Raymond Joseph Dolan =

Irish neuroscientist

Raymond Dolan
- Born: 21 January 1954 (age 72); Galway, Ireland
- Education: National University of Ireland
- Known for: Neuroimaging research
- Awards: 2006 Golden Brain Award; 2017 Brain Prize (with Peter Dayan and Wolfram Schultz); 2019 Ferrier Medal and Lecture
- Scientific career
- Fields: Neuroscience; Neuropsychiatry
- Workplaces: University College London

Raymond Joseph Dolan (born 21 January 1954) is an Irish neuroscientist and the Mary Kinross Professor of Neuropsychiatry at University College London, where he was also the founding director of the Wellcome Trust Centre for Neuroimaging. In 2026, he was elected to the American Philosophical Society.

== Honours and awards ==
In 2006 he was awarded the Golden Brain Award by the Minerva Foundation. In 2015 he presented the Paul B. Baltes Lecture at the Berlin-Brandenburg Academy of Sciences and Humanities. He was one of three recipients of the 2017 Brain Prize, along with Peter Dayan and Wolfram Schultz.

He is a fellow of the Royal Society, the Academy of Medical Sciences, and the Association for Psychological Science. In 2016, he was ranked by Semantic Scholar as the second-most influential neuroscientist in the modern world, behind only his UCL colleague Karl Friston.

In 2019 he was awarded the Ferrier Medal and Lecture by the Royal Society.
