= List of women Clarivate Citation laureates =

The following is a list of candidates considered likely to win the Nobel Prize in their respective field. The candidates are so named based on the citation impact of their published research. Since 2025, six of the 33 female Clarivate Citation laureates starting in 2008 were subsequently awarded with a Nobel Prize: Elizabeth Blackburn and Carol W. Greider in Physiology or Medicine (2009), Emmanuelle Charpentier and Jennifer Doudna in Chemistry (2020), Carolyn Bertozzi in Chemistry (2022), and Claudia Goldin in Economics (2023).

== Female Citation laureates ==
Year	Field	Portrait	Citation Laureate	Nationality	Motivations	Institute
2008	Physics		Vera Rubin (1928–2016)	United States	"for her pioneering research indicating the existence of dark matter in the universe."	Carnegie Institution of Washington
2009	Physiology or Medicine		Elizabeth Blackburn (born 1948)	Australia; United States	"for their roles in the discovery of and pioneering research on telomeres and telomerases." (selected with Jack W. Szostak)	University of California, San Francisco
2009	Physiology or Medicine		Carol W. Greider (born 1961)	United States	"for their roles in the discovery of and pioneering research on telomeres and telomerases." (selected with Jack W. Szostak)	Johns Hopkins School of Medicine
2009	Chemistry		Jacqueline Barton (born 1952)	United States	"for their pioneering research of electron charge transfer in DNA." (selected with Bernd Giese and Gary Schuster)	California Institute of Technology
2011	Economic Sciences		Anne Krueger (born 1934)	United States	"for their description of rent-seeking behavior and its implications." (selected with Gordon Tullock)	Johns Hopkins University
2012	Physics		Lene Hau (born 1959)	Denmark	"for the experimental demonstration of electromagnetically induced transparency (Harris) and of 'slow light' (Harris and Hau)." (selected with Stephen E. Harris)	Harvard University
2015	Physics		Deborah S. Jin (1968–2016)	United States	"for pioneering research on atomic gases at ultra-cold temperatures and the creation of the first fermionic condensate."	University of Colorado
2015	Chemistry		Carolyn Bertozzi (born 1966)	United States	"for foundational contributions to bioorthogonal chemistry."	Stanford University; Howard Hughes Medical Institute
2015	Chemistry		Emmanuelle Charpentier (born 1968)	France	"for the development of the CRISPR-cas9 method for genome editing."	Umeå University; Max Planck Institute for Infection Biology
2015	Chemistry		Jennifer Doudna (born 1964)	United States	"for the development of the CRISPR-cas9 method for genome editing."	University of California, Berkeley; Howard Hughes Medical Institute
2016	Physiology or Medicine		Arlene Sharpe (born 1953)	United States	"for elucidating programmed cell death-1 (PD-1) and its pathway, which has advanced cancer immunotherapy." (selected with Gordon J. Freeman and Tasuku Honjo)	Harvard Medical School; Brigham and Women's Hospital
2017	Physiology or Medicine		Yuan Chang (born 1959)	Taiwan; United States	"for their discovery of the Kaposi's sarcoma-associated herpesvirus, or human herpesvirus 8 (KSHV/HHV8)." (selected with husband Patrick S. Moore)	University of Pittsburgh Cancer Institute
2018	Physics		Sandra Faber (born 1944)	United States	"for pioneering methods to determine the age, size and distance of galaxies and for other contributions to cosmology."	University of California, Santa Cruz
2018	Chemistry		JoAnne Stubbe (born 1946)	United States	"for her discovery that ribonucleotide reductases transform ribonucleotides into deoxyribonucleotides by a free-radical mechanism."	Massachusetts Institute of Technology
2019	Physiology or Medicine		Philippa Marrack (born 1945)	United Kingdom	"for their discovery of T-cell tolerance by clonal elimination in the thymus." (selected with husband John Kappler)	National Jewish Health
2019	Economic Sciences		Katarina Juselius (born 1943)	Finland; Denmark	"for contributions to econometrics and cointegration analysis." (selected with husband Søren Johansen)	University of Copenhagen
2020	Physiology or Medicine		Pamela J. Bjorkman (born 1956)	United States	"for determining the structure and function of major histocompatibility complex (MHC) proteins, a landmark discovery in molecular immunology that has contributed to drug and vaccine development."	California Institute of Technology
2020	Physiology or Medicine		Huda Zoghbi (born 1954)	Lebanon; United States	"for discoveries on the pathogenesis of neurological disorders including the genetic origins of Rett syndrome."	Baylor College of Medicine; Texas Children's Hospital
2020	Economic Sciences		Claudia Goldin (born 1946)	United States	"for contributions to labor economics, especially her analysis of women and the gender pay gap."	Harvard University
2021	Economic Sciences		Carmen Reinhart (born 1955)	Cuba; United States	"for contributions to international macroeconomics and insights on global debt and financial crises."	Harvard Kennedy School
2022	Physiology or Medicine		Virginia Man-Yee Lee (born 1945)	China; United States	"for the identification of TDP-43, a pathological signature of amyotrophic lateral sclerosis (ALS) and frontotemporal lobar degeneration (FTLD), and for other contributions to the study of neurodegenerative diseases." (selected with Masato Hasegawa)	University of Pennsylvania
2022	Physiology or Medicine		Mary-Claire King (born 1946)	United States	"for demonstrating inherited susceptibility for breast and ovarian cancer and discovering the role played by mutations of the BRCA1 gene."	University of Washington
2022	Chemistry		Zhenan Bao (born 1970)	China; United States	"for the development of novel biomimetic applications of organic and polymeric electronic materials, including flexible 'electronic skin'."	Stanford University
2022	Chemistry		Bonnie Bassler (born 1962)	United States	"for research on regulation of gene expression in bacteria through quorum sensing, a chemical communication system." (selected with Everett Peter Greenberg)	Princeton University; Howard Hughes Medical Institute
2023	Physics		Sharon Glotzer (born 1967)	United States	"for demonstrating the role of entropy in the self-assembly of matter and for introducing strategies to control the assembly process to engineer new materials."	University of Michigan
2023	Chemistry		Karen L. Wooley (born 1972)	United States	"for the development of innovative drug and gene targeting and delivery methods." (selected with Vladimir Torchilin and Kazunori Kataoka)	Texas A&M University
2024	Physiology or Medicine		Helen Hobbs (born 1952)	United States	"for research on the genetics of lipid metabolism, which has led to new drugs to treat cardiovascular diseases." (selected with Jonathan C. Cohen)	Howard Hughes Medical Institute; University of Texas Southwestern Medical Center
2024	Physiology or Medicine		Ann Graybiel (born 1942)	United States	"for physiological studies of the basal ganglia, central to motor control and behavior including learning." (selected with Okihide Hikosaka and Wolfram Schultz)	Massachusetts Institute of Technology
2024	Economic Sciences		Janet Currie (born 1957)	Canada; United States	"for pioneering economic analysis of child development."	Princeton University
2025	Physiology or Medicine		Andrea Ablasser (born 1983)	Germany	"for elucidating the cGAS-STING pathway, a fundamental mechanism of innate immunity." (selected with Glen N. Barber and Zhijian Chen)	École Polytechnique Fédérale de Lausanne
2025	Physics		Ingrid Daubechies (born 1954)	Belgium; United States	"for advancing wavelet theory, a revolution in mathematics and physics with practical applications including image processing." (selected with Stéphane Mallat and Yves Meyer)	Duke University
2025	Physics		Ewine van Dishoeck (born 1955)	Netherlands	"for pioneering contributions to astrochemistry revealing interstellar molecular clouds and their role in star and planet formation."	Leiden University; Max Planck Institute for Extraterrestrial Physics
2025	Economic Sciences		Marianne Bertrand (born 1970)	Belgium	"for joint research on racial discrimination, corporate governance, and other aspects of labor economics determined by psychology and culture." (selected with Sendhil Mullainathan)	University of Chicago Booth School of Business
