= Ralph W. Gerard Prize in Neuroscience =

- Awarded for: Honors an outstanding scientist who has made significant contributions to neuroscience throughout his or her career
- Location: Washington, D.C.
- Presented by: Society for Neuroscience
- Reward: US$30,000
- First award: 1978
- Website: www.sfn.org/careers/awards/outstanding-career-and-research-achievements-awards/ralph-w-gerard-prize

The Ralph W. Gerard Award of the Society for Neuroscience (SfN) is an award in neuroscience awarded annually since 1978 for Lifetime Achievement. It is the highest recognition conferred by the SfN. As of 2018, the prize winner receives US$30,000.

It is named in memory of the American neurophysiologist Ralph Waldo Gerard (1900-1974), a founder and honorary president of the Society for Neuroscience (1970-1974) and a professor at the University of Chicago, the University of Michigan and the University of California, Irvine. Gerard was known for his work on the nervous system, psychopharmacology, and biological basis of schizophrenia.

== Recipients ==
- 1978 Stephen William Kuffler
- 1979 Roger Sperry
- 1980 Vernon Mountcastle
- 1981 Herbert Jasper
- 1982 Jerzy E. Rose, Clinton N. Woolsey
- 1983 Walle Nauta
- 1984 Theodore H. Bullock, Susumu Hagiwara
- 1985 Viktor Hamburger, Rita Levi-Montalcini
- 1986 Seymour Solomon Kety
- 1987 Brenda Milner
- 1988 Horace Winchell Magoun, Donald B. Lindsley
- 1989 Seymour Benzer
- 1990 Bernard Katz, Sanford L. Palay
- 1991 Bert Sakmann, Erwin Neher
- 1992 Julius Axelrod
- 1993 David Hubel, Torsten Wiesel
- 1994 Paul Greengard
- 1995 Hans Thoenen, Eric M. Shooter
- 1996 Louis Sokoloff
- 1997 Eric Kandel
- 1998 Edward R. Perl
- 1999 Charles F. Stevens
- 2000 Solomon Halbert Snyder
- 2001 William Maxwell Cowan
- 2002 Patricia Goldman-Rakic, Paško Rakić
- 2003 A. James Hudspeth
- 2004 Masakazu Konishi, Nobuo Suga
- 2005 Sten Grillner, Eve Marder
- 2006 Horace Barlow, Robert Henry Wurtz
- 2007 Friedrich Bonhoeffer, Nicole Marthe Le Douarin
- 2008 Mortimer Mishkin, Marcus Raichle
- 2009 Lily Jan, Yuh Nung Jan
- 2010 Ricardo Miledi
- 2011 Carla Shatz
- 2012 Colin Blakemore
- 2013 Carol A. Barnes
- 2014 Roger Andrew Nicoll, Richard Tsien
- 2015 Story Landis
- 2016 Ben Barres, Thomas Jessell
- 2017 Mary E. Hatten
- 2018 Rodolfo Llinas
- 2019 Michael E. Greenberg, Catherine Dulac
- 2020 György Buzsáki
- 2021 Richard L. Huganir
- 2022 Jon Kaas
- 2023 Michael Stryker
- 2024 Allan Basbaum and Nora D. Volkow

== See also ==
- List of neuroscience awards
- The Brain Prize
- Golden Brain Award
- The Kavli Prize in Neuroscience
- W. Alden Spencer Award
- Karl Spencer Lashley Award
- The Mind & Brain Prize
- Gruber Prize in Neuroscience
