= Daniel Wolpert =

British neuroscientist

Daniel Wolpert FRS FMedSci
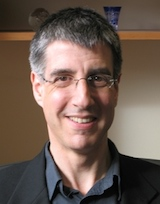
- Born: 8 September 1963 (age 63); England
- Citizenship: UK
- Education: Trinity Hall, Cambridge; Magdalen College, Oxford; Lincoln College, Oxford
- Spouse: Mary Anne Shorrock
- Father: Lewis Wolpert
- Awards: FMedSci (2004); Crick Lecture (2005); Golden Brain Award (2010); FRS (2012)
- Scientific career
- Fields: Neuroscience; Computational neuroscience; Motor control
- Workplaces: Columbia University; University of Cambridge; University College London; MIT
- Thesis: Overcoming time delays in sensorimotor control (1992)
- Doctoral advisor: John Stein
- Doctoral students: Sarah-Jayne Blakemore
- Website: wolpertlab.com

Daniel Mark Wolpert (born 8 September 1963) is a British medical doctor, neuroscientist and engineer, who has made important contributions in computational biology. He was Professor of Engineering at the University of Cambridge from 2005, and also became the Royal Society Noreen Murray Research Professorship in Neurobiology from 2013. He is now Professor of Neurobiology at Columbia University.

== Early life and education ==
Wolpert was educated at the Hall School and Westminster School. He went on to Trinity Hall, Cambridge, to study mathematics, but after only a year he shifted to medicine, as it seemed to him "that medics were having much more fun than mathematicians." He completed a Bachelor of Arts in medical sciences in 1985, then completed his Bachelor of Medicine, Bachelor of Surgery (BM BCh) in 1988, and PhD in physiology in 1992 from the University of Oxford.

== Career ==
Wolpert pursued computational neuroscience as postdoctoral researcher (1992–1994) and McDonnell-Pew Fellow (1994–1995) in the Department of Brain and Cognitive Sciences at Massachusetts Institute of Technology. Daniel Wolpert on his qualification as medical doctor worked as Medical House officer in Oxford, in 1988. After completion of his research in 1995, he joined the faculty of Sobell Department of Neurophysiology, Institute of Neurology, University College London, as a Lecturer. He became Reader in Motor Neuroscience in 1999, and full Professor in 2002. He was appointed to Professor of Engineering at the Department of Engineering, University of Cambridge, in 2005. In 2013, he also became the Royal Society Noreen Murray Research Professorship in Neurobiology. In 2018, he moved to Columbia University to become Professor of Neurobiology.

== Awards and honours ==
Wolpert was elected a Fellow of the Royal Society in 2012, his nomination reads

Daniel Wolpert is a world leader in the computational study of sensorimotor control and learning, transforming our understanding of how the brain controls movement. Combining theoretical and behavioural work, he has placed the field of sensorimotor control firmly within the probabilistic domain and shown how neural noise plays a pivotal role in determining both how we process information during action and how we generate actions. His empirical discoveries and theoretical work on internal models have shown how ubiquitous they are for a range of core processes from motor learning, through sensory processing to social cognition; and how disorders of internal models can lead to neuropsychological disorders.

Other awards include:

- 1982–1985 Thomas Cannon Brooke's Scholarship for Mathematics, Trinity Hall, Cambridge
- 1989–1992 Senior Scholarship, Lincoln College, Oxford
- 1992–1995 Fulbright Scholarship
- 2004 Fellow of the Academy of Medical Sciences (FMedSci)
- 2005 Swartz foundation Mind-Brain Lecture, Stony Brook University
- 2005 Royal Society Francis Crick Prize Lecture
- 2005 Professorial Fellow of Trinity College, Cambridge
- 2007 Alice and Joseph Brooks International Lecture, Harvard University
- 2007 Annual Cognitive Science Lecture, Royal Netherlands Academy of Arts and Sciences
- 2009 Fred Kavli Distinguished International Scientist Lecture, Society for Neuroscience
- 2010 Golden Brain Award of the Minerva Foundation
- 2012 Fellow of the Royal Society (FRS)
- 2012 Wellcome Trust Senior Investigator Award (for seven years)
- 2013 Royal Society Noreen Murray Research Professorship in Neurobiology
- 2021 Royal Society Ferrier Medal and Lecture

== Personal life ==
Wolpert is the son of South-African born developmental and evolutionary biologist Lewis Wolpert, and his wife Elizabeth (née Brownstein).

Since 1990, Wolpert has been married to Mary Anne Shorrock; they have two daughters.
