= Michael Merzenich =

American neuroscientist and professor

Michael M. Merzenich
- Born: Michael Matthias Merzenich; 1942 (age 83–84); Lebanon, Oregon, U.S.
- Education: University of Portland (SB); Johns Hopkins Medical School (PhD); University of Wisconsin
- Known for: Brain plasticity research
- Medical career
- Profession: Neuroscience
- Institutions: University of California, San Francisco
- Research: Basic and clinical sciences of hearing
- Awards: National Academy of Sciences, Institute of Medicine, Kavli Prize, Russ Prize, Karl Spencer Lashley Award

Michael Matthias Merzenich (/ˈmɜːrzənɪk/ MURR-zə-nik; born 1942 in Lebanon, Oregon) is an American neuroscientist and professor emeritus at the University of California, San Francisco. He took the sensory cortex maps developed by his predecessors (Archie Tunturi, Clinton Woolsey, Vernon Mountcastle, Wade Marshall, and Philip Bard) and refined them using dense micro-electrode mapping techniques. Using this, he definitively showed there to be multiple somatotopic maps of the body in the postcentral sulcus, and multiple tonotopic maps of the acoustic inputs in the superior temporal plane.

He led the cochlear implant team at UCSF, which transferred its technology to Advanced Bionics, and their version is the Clarion cochlear implant. He collaborated with Bill Jenkins and Gregg Recanzone to demonstrate sensory maps are labile into adulthood in animals performing operant sensory tasks. He collaborated with Paula Tallal, Bill Jenkins, and Steve Miller to form the company Scientific Learning. This was based on Fast ForWord software they co-invented that produces improvements in children's language skills that has been related to the magnitude of their temporal processing impairments prior to training, though the program's effectiveness is disputed.

Merzenich was director and Chief Scientific Officer of Scientific Learning between November 1996 and January 2003. Merzenich took two sabbaticals from UCSF, in 1997 and 2004. In 1997 he led research teams at Scientific Learning Corporation, and in 2004 at Posit Science Corporation. Currently, Merzenich's second company, Posit Science Corporation, is working on a broad range of behavioral therapies. Their lead product is a brain-training application called BrainHQ (TM). Merzenich is Chief Scientific Officer, and on the Board of Directors, at Posit Science.

== Early life and education ==
Born in Lebanon, Oregon in 1942, Merzenich grew up fascinated by science. He attended the University of Portland in Portland, Oregon earning his Bachelor of Science in 1964. Here, he was valedictorian, receiving only one non-A, a C in a philosophy course in which he argued with the instructor. In 1968 he earned his PhD in Physiology at Johns Hopkins Medical School in the lab of Vernon Mountcastle, studying neural coding of stimulus magnitude in the hairy skin. He left Johns Hopkins to conduct his postdoctoral studies at the University of Wisconsin under Jerzy Rose. There, he did a cross-species analysis of the cochlear nucleus in large game cats and pinnipeds, did the first auditory cortical microelectrode maps in the macaque with John Brugge, and the first somatosensory maps in the macaque with neurosurgeon Ron Paul. He earned his neurophysiology fellowship between 1968 and 1971. He left Wisconsin to join the faculty at UCSF as the only basic scientist in the clinical Otolaryngology department, head and neck surgery. Merzenich started with UCSF in 1971 as faculty member becoming full professor in 1980. Merzenich was Co-Director at the Coleman Memorial Laboratory where he conducted research on the cerebral cortex. He was also the Francis A. Sooy Chair of Otolaryngology, in the Keck Center for Integrative Neurosciences at UCSF. His research examines neurological illness, learning processes and the neurological processes of the cerebral cortex. He remains in the same department, now as a professor emeritus, retiring in 2007.

== Research on brain plasticity ==
Merzenich has collaborated in numerous studies researching brain plasticity. In February 2004, Merzenich gave a TED talk titled “Growing evidence of brain plasticity” which outlines the basic findings of his research. Merzenich has helped to identify two distinct periods of brain plasticity: The Critical Period and the period of Adult Plasticity. The Infant Critical Period is when a child’s brain establishes neural processes for the stimuli to which it is presented. The Adult Plasticity period is when the brain refines its neural processes as it masters a variety of tasks.

Understanding how the brain can re-wire itself has allowed Merzenich, Tallal, and other colleagues to develop strategies intended to remediate individuals with any speech, language, and reading deficits. Through research in experience dependent learning with non-human primates, neurophysiologists including Merzenich have demonstrated that neuroplasticity remains through adulthood. Further studies with monkeys suggested that the Hebbian learning principles that drive neuroplasticity can be used to treat learning-language impaired children.

Dr. James T. Todd, a professor of psychology, has criticized Michael Merzenich for using the term "miraculous" to describe evidence allegedly supporting the rapid prompting method, claiming that scientific outliers are hard to analyze in the laboratory and replicate. Todd says that it is always important to question scientific outliers.

== Awards ==
In May 1999, Merzenich was honored by election into the National Academy of Sciences for his research on brain plasticity.

He went on to be elected to the National Academy's Institute of Medicine in 2008, making him one of a very select few to have been elected to more than one of the National Academies.

As of 2001, he received the Award for Distinguished Scientific Contributions. He has been awarded the International Ipsen Prize,

- Zülch Prize of the Max-Planck Institute,
- Thomas Alva Edison Patent Award,
- The Purkinje Medal, and
- Karl Spencer Lashley Award.

In 2015, the National Academy of Engineering awarded Dr. Merzenich the Fritz J. and Dolores H. Russ Prize, the most prestigious award in bioengineering, for his work on cochlear implants. In 2016 he was awarded one of the world's top neuroscience prizes, the Kavli Prize, for his achievements in the field of brain plasticity. He also became elected to the Norwegian Academy of Science and Letters.

Merzenich has published more than 200 articles.

His work is also often covered in the popular press, including The New York Times, The Wall Street Journal, Time and Newsweek.

He has appeared on Sixty Minutes II, CBS Evening News and Good Morning America. His work has been featured on four PBS specials and the ABC Australia documentary "Redesign My Brain" (which aired on Discovery Channel as "Hack My Brain" in the United States.)

He holds nearly 100 US patents.

== Federal grants ==
Federal grant awards Michael Merzenich leading researcher
Year	Grant abstract	Citation	Recipient organization	Granted by	Amount	Inflationary conversion
2005–2006	Brain plasticity based training for focal dystonia		Posit Science Corporation	NICHD	$195,727	$322,700
2001–2005	Auditory and somatosensory cortex Javits grant		UCSF	NINDS	$1,662,734	$3.02 million
2005	Brain plasticity based training for Schizophrenia Fast-Track proposal		Posit Science Corporation	NIMH	$139,811	$230,500
2005	Brain plasticity rehabilitaton of visual cognition		Posit Science Corporation	NEI	$97,350	$160,500
1996–2000	Functional organization of auditory somatosensory cortex		UCSF	NINDS	$1,245,234	$2.56 million
1992–1995	Design Of Pediatric Cochlear Implants		UCSF	NIDCD	$1,097,866	$2.52 million
1981–1995	Functional Organization Of The Central Auditory System		UCSF	NINDS	$1,324,202	$3.04 million
1987	Sensory Disorders And Language Study Section		U.S. PHS PUBLIC ADVISORY GROUPS	CSR	–	–
1987	Scala Tympani Electrode Arrays		UCSF	NINDS	–	–
1977–1980	Development Of An Acoustic Prosthesis		UCSF	NINDS	–	–
1980–1982	Develop Electrodes For Auditory Prosthesis		UCSF	NINDS	–	–
1975–1980	Functional Organization Of The Auditory System		UCSF	NINDS	–	–
1977–1980	Develop Multichannel Electrodes For Auditory Prosthesis		UCSF	NINDS	–	–
1972–1974	Studies On Organization Of Central Auditory System		UCSF	NINDS	–	–

== Patents and inventions ==
Merzenich holds nearly 100 U.S. patents. Along with Peter B. Delahunt, Joseph L. Hardy, Henry W. Mahncke, and Donald Richards hold the patent for visual emphasis for cognitive training exercises. This patent explores a computer system of visual learning. The participant observes a scene which shows at least one foreground object against a background. The background or foreground are modified to enhance the participants response to achieve a correct response in an iterative basis.

== Published works ==
Merzenich has contributed to over 232 publications.

- Stryker, Michael P.; Jenkins, William M.; Merzenich, MM (September 18, 1987). "Anesthetic State Does Not Affect the Map of the Hand Representation Within Area 3b Somatosensory Cortex in Owl Monkey" (PDF). The Journal of Comparative Neurology. 258 (2): 297–303. doi:10.1002/cne.902580209. PMID 3584542. S2CID 1526170.
- Allard, T.T.; Clark, W. M. Jenkins and M. M. Merzenich (September 18, 1987). "Syndactyly results in the emergence of dougle-digit fields in somatosensory cortex in adult owl monkeys". Soc. Neurosci. Abstract 11:965 (Listed in the bibliography for Abstract 11:965).
- Jenkins, W.M.; Merzenich, M. M.; Ochs, M. T. (September 18, 1987). "Behaviorally controlled differential use of restricted hand surfaces induce changes in the cortical representation of the hand in area 3b of adult owl monkeys". Soc. Neurosci. Abstract 10:665 (Listed in the bibliography for Abstract 11:965): 303.
- Jenkins, William M.; Merzenich, Michael M. (1987). "Chapter 21 Reorganization of neocortical representations after brain injury: A neurophysiological model of the bases of recovery from stroke". Neural Regeneration. Progress in Brain Research. Vol. 71. pp. 249–266. doi:10.1016/s0079-6123(08)61829-4. ISBN 978-0-444-80814-1. PMID 3588947.
- Merzenich, M. M.; Sur, M.; Nelson, R. J.; Kaus, J. H. (1981). "The organization of the Si cortex. Multiple representations of the body in primate.". In Woolsey, C. N. (ed.). Cortical Sensory Organization. Vol. 1: Multiple Somatic Areas. p. 303.
- Merzenich, M. M.; Kaas, J. H.; Wall, J.; Nelson, R. J.; Sur, M.; Felleman, D. (1983). "Topographic reorganization of somatosensory cortical areas 3b and 1 in adult monkeys following restricted deafferentation". Neuroscience. 8 (1): 33–55. CiteSeerX 10.1.1.520.9299. doi:10.1016/0306-4522(83)90024-6. PMID 6835522. S2CID 6278328.
- Merzenich, M. M.; Kaas, J. H.; Wall, J. T.; Sur, M.; Nelson, R. J.; Felleman, D. J. (1983). "Progression of change following median nerve section in the cortical representation of the hand in areas 3b and 1 in adult owl and squirrel monkeys". Neuroscience. 10 (3): 639–65. CiteSeerX 10.1.1.459.5967. doi:10.1016/0306-4522(83)90208-7. PMID 6646426. S2CID 4930.
- Merzenich, M. M.; Jenkins, W. M.; Middlebrooks, J. C. (1984). "Observations and hypotheses on special organizational features of the central auditory nervous system.". In G. Edleman; M. Cowan; E. Gall (eds.). Dynamic Aspects of Neocortical Function. New York: John Wiley and Sons. p. 303.
- Merzenich, M. M.; Nelson, R. J.; Kaas, J. H.; Stryker, M. P.; Jenkins, W. M.; Zook, J. M.; Cynader, M. S.; Schoppmann, A. (1987). "Variability in hand surface representations in areas 3b and 1 in adult owl and squirrel monkeys" (PDF). The Journal of Comparative Neurology. 258 (2): 281–96. doi:10.1002/cne.902580208. PMID 3584541. S2CID 11496469.
- Wall, J. T.; Kaas, J. H.; Sur, M.; Nelson, R. J.; Felleman, D. J.; Merzenich, M. M. (1986). "Functional reorganization in somatosensory cortical areas 3b and 1 of adult monkeys after median nerve repair: Possible relationships to sensory recovery in humans". The Journal of Neuroscience. 6 (1): 218–33. doi:10.1523/JNEUROSCI.06-01-00218.1986. PMC 6568627. PMID 3944620.
- Merzenich, M.M.; Jenkins, W.M.; Jonhston, P.; Schreiner, C.; Miller, S.L.; Tallal, P. (1996). "Temporal processing deficits of language-learning impaired children ameliorated by training". Science. 271 (5245): 77–81. Bibcode:1996Sci...271...77M. doi:10.1126/science.271.5245.77. PMID 8539603. S2CID 24141773.
- Merzenich, M. M.; Jenkins, W. M. (1995). "Cortical plasticity, learning, and learning dysfunction". In B. Julesz; I. Kovacs (eds.). Maturational Windows and Adult Cortical Plasticity. Vol. 23. pp. 247–271.
- Merzenich, M. M.; Tallal, P.; Peterson, B.; Miller, S. L.; Jenkins, W. M. (1999). "Some neurological principles relevant to the origins of - and the cortical plasticity based remediation of - language learning impairments". In J. Grafman (ed.). Neuroplasticity: Building a Bridge from the Laboratory to the Clinic. pp. 169–187.

== Book editor ==
- Syka, Josef; Merzenich, Michael M. (2003). Plasticity and Signal Representation in the Auditory System. Springer. ISBN 978-0-387-23154-9.
- Rosen, S.; Fourcin, A.J., Abberton, E., Walliker, J.R., Howard, D.M., Moore, B.C.J., Douek, E.E. & Frampton, S. (ed.) R. A. Schindler & M. M. Merzenich. (1985). Assessing assessment. In Cochlear Implants, New York: Raven Press. Springer.

== See also ==
- Activity-dependent plasticity
- Brain fitness
- Cognitive neuroscience
- Is Google Making Us Stupid?
- List of members of the National Academy of Sciences (Systems neuroscience)
- Mind and Life Institute
- Timeline of psychology
