= Mickey Goldberg =

American neuroscientist

Michael E. Goldberg
- Born: New York, New York
- Education: Harvard College, Harvard Medical School
- Fields: Cognitive and sensory neuroscience, neurology

Michael E. Goldberg (born August 10, 1941), also known as Mickey Goldberg, is an American neuroscientist and David Mahoney Professor at Columbia University. He is known for his work on the mechanisms of the mammalian eye in relation to brain activity. He served as president of the Society for Neuroscience from 2009 to 2010.

== Early life ==
Michael E. Goldberg was born on August 10, 1941, in New York, New York. His father received his master's degree in chemistry from Columbia University and proceeded to get his DDS from New York University Dental School. Soon after, he opened up his own dental practice. Michael's eventual passion for science budded from his father's encouragement to study chemistry. His father often gave him chemistry sets and children's books about chemistry to pique his interest in science.

During his high school career, Goldberg was a very bright student and became an Eagle Scout. He had the highest score in New York State on the statewide scholarship exam. In the summer between high school and college he landed a job working in a lab for the Burroughs-Wellcome drug company. The lab was headed by George Hitchings and Gertrude Elion and focused its work on purine and pyrimidine antimetabolites. Goldberg was a lab technician collecting data on a research project that eventually ending up producing the drugs azathioprine (Immuran) and azacytosine (AZT). Immuran was the first successful nonsteroid immunosuppressant used in kidney transplants and AZT became the first successful treatment for AIDS. For their major discovery, Hitchings and Elion shared the Nobel Prize in Physiology or Medicine in 1988.

== Education and career ==
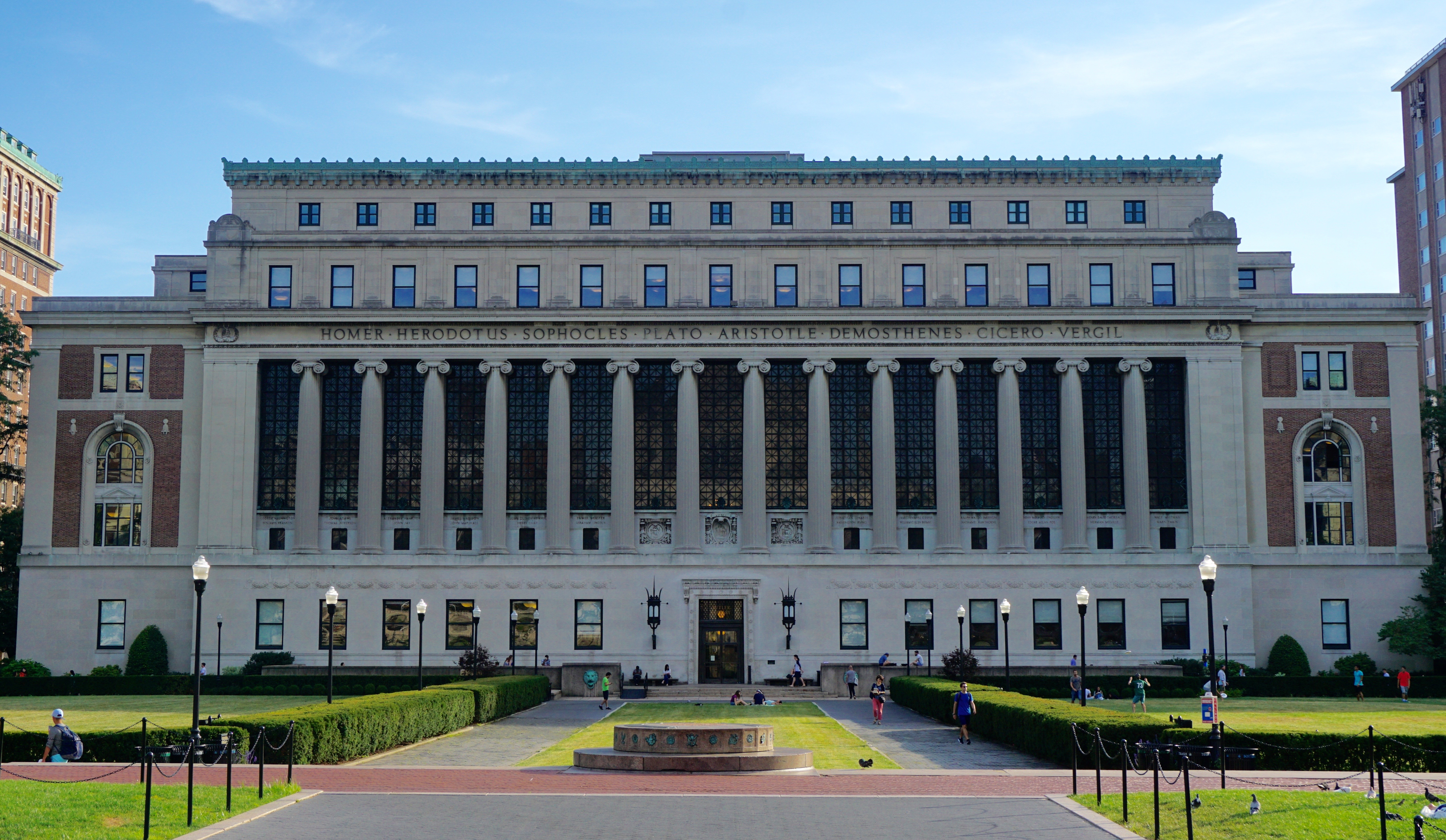
Butler Library at Columbia University

This is a list of Goldberg's education from 1959 to 1968 and subsequent professional positions.

- Harvard College, 1959 to 1963, A.B. in Biochemical Sciences, switched concentration from English to Biochemical Sciences
- Rockefeller Institute for Medical Research Graduate, 1963 to 1964, worked in the Allfrey-Mirsky lab with calf liver nucleus histones
- Harvard Medical School, 1964 to 1968, MD
- Peter Bent Brigham Hospital, 1968 to 1969, medical internship.
- Staff associate of Dr. Robert H. Wurtz at the National Institute of Mental Health from 1969 to 1972.
- Resident in Neurology in the Harvard Longwood Program (Peter Bent Brigham, Boston Children's, and Beth Israel Hospitals), 1972-1975.
- Research neurologist at the Armed Forces Radiobiology Research Institute, 1975 to 1978
- Board certification in adult neurology, American Board of Psychiatry and Neurology, 1977.
- Investigator in the Laboratory of Sensorimotor Research at the National Eye Institute and professor of neurology at the National Institute of Health through Georgetown University School of Medicine, 1978 to 2001
- Professor of Brain and Behavior in the Department of Neuroscience, Neurology, Psychiatry, and Ophthalmology and Director of the Mahoney Center for Mind and Brain at Columbia University College of Physicians and Surgeons, researcher and chief of the Neurobiology and Behavior Division of New York State Psychiatric Institute, and senior attending neurologist at New York Presbyterian Hospital through Columbia University Medical Center, 2001 to present

== Research ==
=== Focus ===
Cerebral hemispheres - the parietal cortex in question is located at the back and top of the cerebral cortex

Goldberg is known for his research on brain activity in relation to the mechanisms of mammalian eye movement.

Because the mammalian eye is constantly in motion, the brain must create a mechanism for how to represent space in order to accurately perceive the outside world and enact voluntary movement. The rapid movement of the eye between two points, called a saccade, draws the focus of the eye towards new or moving stimuli. If this is in the middle of a movement after the brain has sent out plans to complete a movement, the eye will see the movement being performed. That movement being perceived will be sent back to the eye, and the brain will perceive what action was completed and will compensate to fit the actual movement desired. This is called corollary discharge, and it is one of the mechanisms in the cerebral cortex to account for spatially accurate vision. Many areas of the brain help with this function, including the frontal eye fields and the lateral intraparietal area, where neurons are active before the saccade is discharged, which brings the new point of focus into the visual field. This presaccadic shift in the neuron's receptive field excites the neuron before the eye even moves onto the next site. Brain areas including the superior colliculus are important for visual processing. The pre-striate area of the visual cortex, V4, and the parietal reach regions are all also important for this.

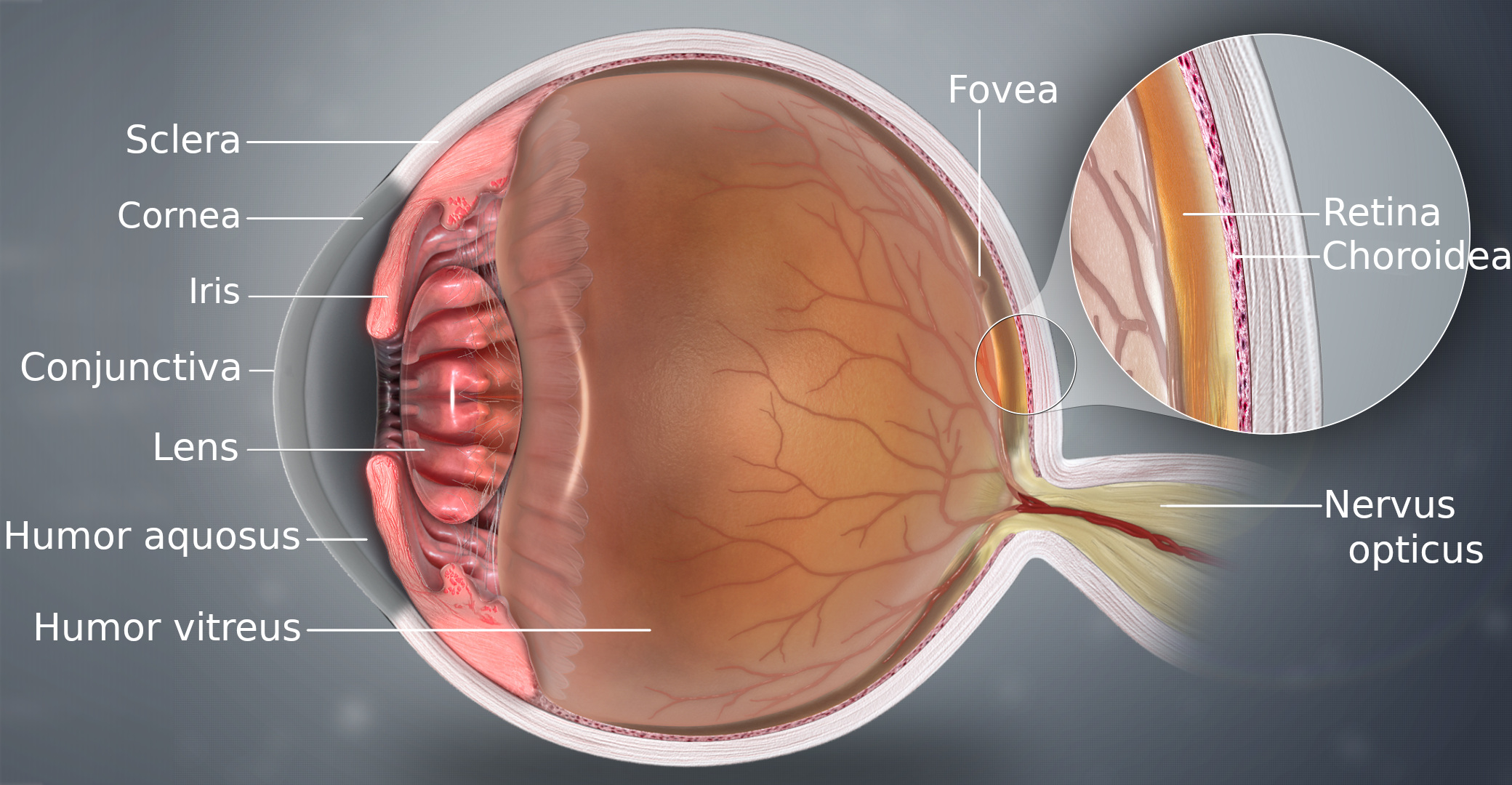
3D Medical Animation Eye Structure

However, the most important region of the brain for this type of processing would be the lateral intraparietal area, which has been studied in relation to attention and intention, as well as processing in the brain of those saccadic eye movements. The lateral intraparietal area, the LIP, is associated with attention in the visual space and saccades. The LIP acts like a priority map, with each stimulus being represented according to their priority as part of the behavior that is going to be performed, usually as part of corollary discharge. The higher priority the task, the more activity in the LIP. This priority map has both top-down and bottom-up influences; the top-down influences come from a drive from behavioral and task demands, as well as reward. This top-down influence can specifically be seen in the high activity in the LIP when a distractor, a task-irrelevant stimulus, is introduced into the receptive field of a monkey, a common animal model in the study of complex brain processing. If a distractor is flashed in the receptive field of the monkey during its time to plan a memory-guided saccade, a saccade driven toward a remembered object or point in the receptive field from a previous visual stimulus, the monkey will target the eye the move first towards the distractor, then back to the target of the memory-guided saccade. The activity in the LIP predicts the center of attention, such as how the memory-guided saccade elicits a more robust response in the LIP than the distractor and is particularly active during the time in which the eye moves from the distractor back to the target of the memory-guided saccade. The top-down influence on saccades is the drive of the eye to move back to the target of the memory-guided saccade due to task demands or potential rewards.

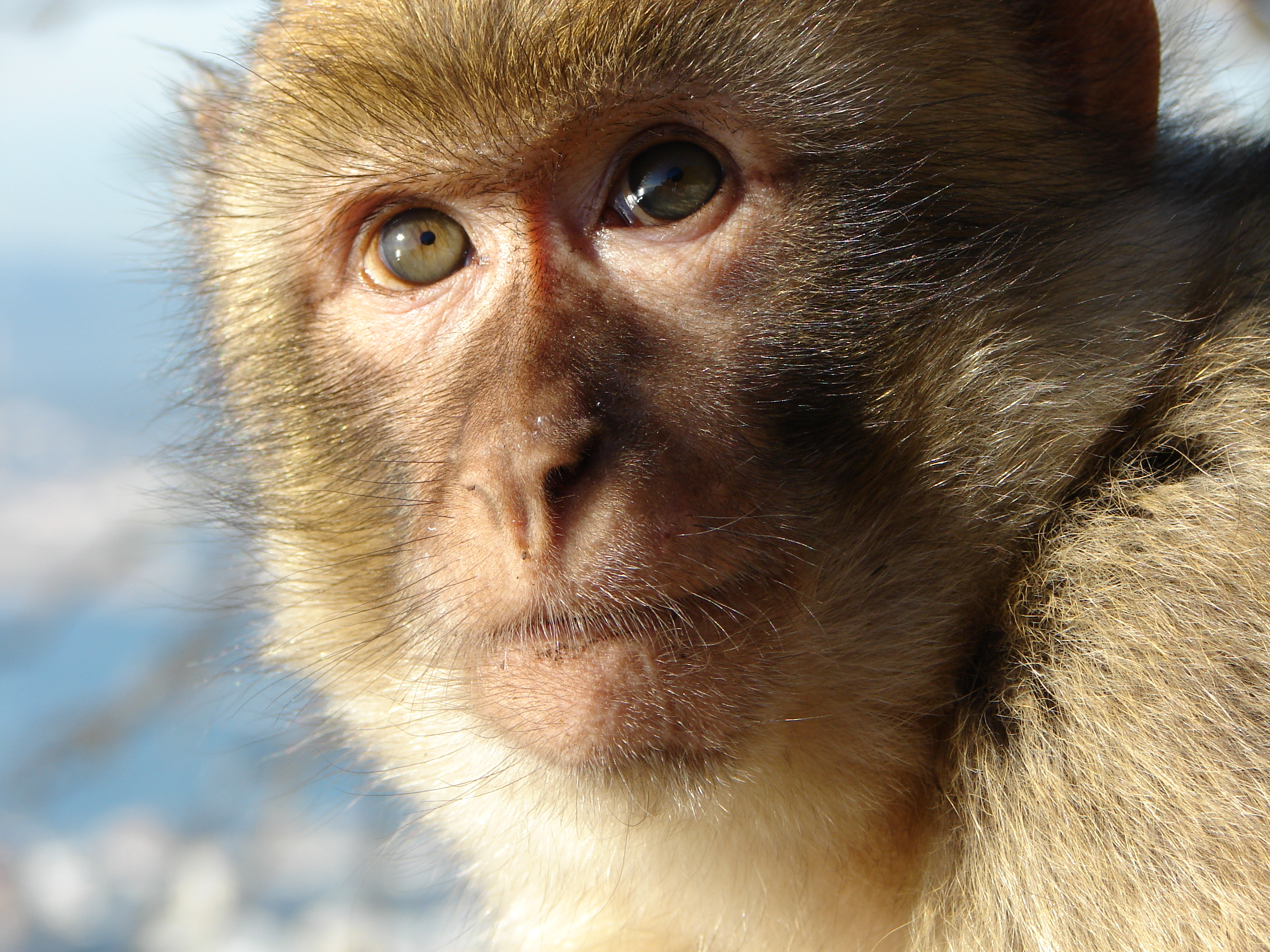
Gibraltar Barbary Macaque commonly used as an animal model for complex brain processing

The priority map is interpreted by the oculomotor system to determine where the center of attention should be focused, as well as where the goal of the saccade is. The bottom-up influence is a saliency signal likely generated by the primary visual cortex (V1) from external sensory inputs, it is seen simply when the LIP neurons elicit a rapid response when that distractor is flashed quickly into the visual field, and the eye moves towards the distractor, instead of following to the target of the memory-guided saccade due to the stimulation of the visual receptors with the distractor. Bottom-up processing primarily consists of the brain processing indicating that there is an object in the receptive field, with no understanding of what that object is.

Most background and irrelevant stimuli shows low activity in the LIP. This priority map receives input from both the dorsal and ventral streams of processing, which process moving visual stimuli and recognize objects. Areas of the visual cortex including V2, V3, V3a, V4, all part of visual processing, and MT and MST, which specifically respond to moving stimuli are all also important in visual processing. The LIP drives saccades, attention, and gathers evidence about the environment in order to properly discharge movement. Psychophysical evidence has also suggested two ways in which space is represented in the brain during corollary discharge: a retinotopic representation, which is rapid and driven by the position of the eye, and a craniotopic representation, which is slower due to the processing of the receptive field within the brain. How space is represented within the brain, in relation to attention and movement, is a complex process that is still being studied currently.

Although his efforts have always been primarily dedicated to research, Goldberg has always served as a clinical neurologist, seeing patients and teaching neurology to students and residents, from 1977 to 2001 at Georgetown University Hospital, and from 2003 until the present at the Columbia campus of the New York Presbyterian Hospital.

=== Publications ===
This is a list of the highlights of Goldberg's publications. He has been a part of many different publications from 1971-2020. Some of these include:

- 1971: Wurtz RH, Goldberg ME. Superior colliculus cell responses related to eye movements in awake monkeys. Science. 171: 82-4. PMID 4992313
- 1972: Goldberg ME, Wurtz RH. Activity of superior colliculus in behaving monkey. I. Visual receptive fields of single neurons. Journal of Neurophysiology. 35: 542-59. PMID 4624739
- 1981: Bushnell MC, Goldberg ME Robinson DL. Behavioral enhancement of visual responses in monkey cerebral cortex: I. Modulation in posterior parietal cortex related to selective visual attention. Journal of Neurophysiology. 46: 755-772. 7288463
- 1993: Colby CL, Duhamel JR, Goldberg ME. The updating of the representation of visual space in parietal cortex by intended eye movements. Science. 255: 90-92. PMID 1553535
- 1998: Gottlieb JP, Kusunoki M, Goldberg ME The representation of visual salience in monkey parietal cortex. Nature. 391(6666):481-4. PMID 9461214
- 2003: Bisley JW, Goldberg ME. Neuronal activity in the lateral intraparietal area and spatial attention. Science. 2003 299(5603):81-6. PMID 12511644
- 2007: Wang, X, Zhang M, Cohen IS and Goldberg, ME . The proprioceptive representation of eye position in monkey primary somatosensory cortex. Nature Neuroscience. 10: 640-646. PMID 17396123
- 2020: Sendhilnathan N, Semework M, Goldberg ME, Ipata AE. Neural Correlates of Reinforcement Learning in Mid-lateral Cerebellum. Neuron. 106: 188-198. PMID 32001108

=== Awards and honors ===
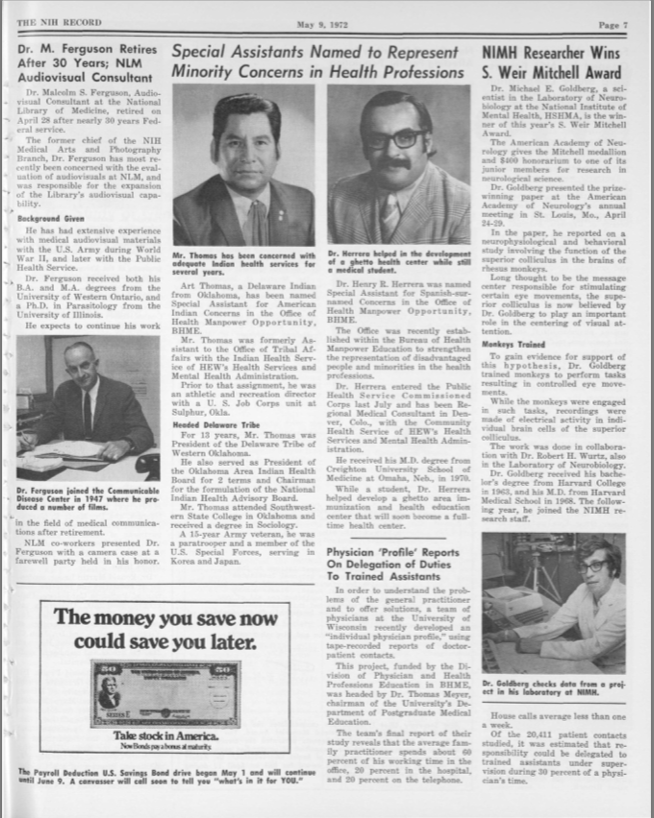
S. Weir Mitchell Award won by Michael E. Goldberg in 1971.

As well as taking part in many publications, Michael E. Goldberg has won multiple honors and awards for his research. Some of them include:

- 1972: S. Weir Mitchell Award, Best Research Essay by a junior member of the American Academy of Neurology
- 1996-1998: Trustee, Neural Control of Movement Society
- Society for Neuroscience, Treasurer (2006) and President (2010)
- 2006: Louis P. Rowland Teaching Award, Columbia University Department of Neurology
- 2006: Fellow of the American Academy of Arts and Sciences
- 2008: Fellow of the American Association for the Advancement of Science
- 2010: Swammerdam Lecturer, Netherlands Neuroscience Institute, Amsterdam
- 2011: Elected to the National Academy of Sciences
- 2011: Patricia Goldman-Rakic Award for Cognitive Neuroscience, Brain and Behavior Research Foundation
- 2019: Golden Brain Award of the Minerva Foundation
- 2020: Lifetime Achievement Keynote Award from the Neural Control of Movement Society
