= Michael Shadlen =

American neuroscientist and neurologist (born 1959)

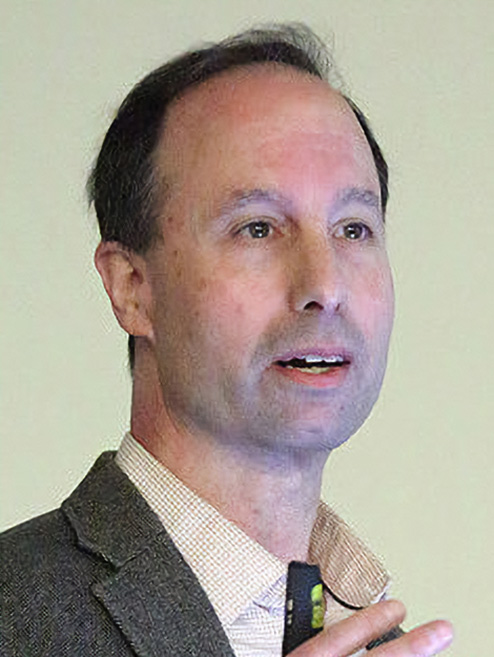
- Born: August 19, 1959 (age 67); New York City
- Education: Brown University; UC Berkeley; Alpert Medical School
- Awards: W. Alden Spencer Award (2009); Golden Brain Award (2012)}; National Academy of Sciences (2023)
- Scientific career
- Workplaces: Columbia University; HHMI
- Thesis: Neural Mechanisms of Stereoscopic Depth Perception (1985)
- Doctoral advisor: Ralph D Freeman
- Other academic advisors: William Newsome
- Website: www.shadlenlab.columbia.edu

Michael Neil Shadlen (born August 19, 1959) is an American neuroscientist and neurologist, whose research concerns the neural mechanisms of decision-making. He has been Professor of Neuroscience at Columbia University since 2012 and a Howard Hughes Medical Investigator since 2000. He is a member of the Kavli Institute for Brain Science, a Principal Investigator at the Mortimer B. Zuckerman Mind Brain Behavior Institute and an elected member of the National Academy of Medicine and National Academy of Sciences.

Shadlen is a jazz guitarist and interested in the relation between jazz and neuroscience.

== Education ==
Shadlen earned a Bachelor of Arts degree in biology at Brown University in 1981. He completed his Ph.D. in neurobiology at the University of California, Berkeley in 1985 under the direction of Ralph D. Freeman. Shadlen completed his M.D. at Brown University's Alpert Medical School in 1988.

== Career ==
Shadlen completed his residency at Stanford University School of Medicine where he was Chief Resident from 1991 to 1992 and Clinical Instructor from 1993 to 1994. He pursued neuroscience as a postdoctoral researcher at Stanford in the lab of William Newsome before joining the faculty of the Department of Physiology and Biophysics at the University of Washington. Shadlen became a Howard Hughes Medical Investigator in 2000.

Shadlen joined Columbia University in 2012 as Professor of Neuroscience. Нe is a member of the editorial board for Current Biology.

Shadlen helped establish the subfield of neurobiology dealing with decision-making, where his research explores such topics as multitasking, reasoning and memory retrieval. His research aims to test the hypothesis that these higher brain functions have shared mechanisms.

== Awards and honors ==
Shadlen was elected a Member of the National Academy of Medicine in 2014 and a Fellow of the American Association for the Advancement of Science in 2015.

Other awards include:

- 1995-1997 McKnight Scholar Award
- 2007 Swartz foundation Mind-Brain Lecture, Stony Brook University
- 2009 Alden Spencer Prize, Columbia University
- 2012 Golden Brain Award of the Minerva Foundation
- 2014 Fellow of Association for Psychological Science
- 2017 Karl Spencer Lashley Award, American Philosophical Society
