= International years of science =

International science event hosted by Germany

International Years of Science is an annual event that was hosted by the German Federal Ministry of Education and Research (BMBF) starting in 2007. The event promotes university research and development projects and support for vocational education.

The German BMBF and the corresponding ministry in the partner country invite research institutions and educational establishments to present their joint projects to the public. The International Bureau of the BMBF at the German Aerospace Center (DLR) supports the BMBF in the coordination and communications activities of the International Years of Science.

== Previous events ==
=== The German-Egyptian Year of Science and Technology 2007 ===
The motto of the German-Egyptian Year of Science and Technology was "Linking Scientific Masterminds". It was jointly launched by the Research Ministers of both countries on 15 January 2007 in Cairo. It implemented a German-Egyptian Research Fund (GERF) and the German University of Cairo (GUC). These events included the opening ceremony in Cairo, the multimedia show "Culturama" in Berlin, the open day on the research vessel METEOR in Port Said, the centennial celebration of the German Archaeological Institute in Cairo, the exhibition "Egypt’s Sunken Treasures" in Bonn, and the exhibition of mummies and an accompanying academic programme at the Landesmuseum.

=== The German-Israeli Year of Science and Technology 2008 ===
The German-Israeli Year of Science and Technology was held in Berlin on 8 April 2008. Emphasis was given to cooperation between Israel and Germany. The BMBF introduced the Award for Research Cooperation and Highest Excellence (ARCHES). The application and selection procedure is administered by the Minerva Foundation.

=== German-Chinese Year of Science and Education 2009/10 ===
The slogan "Together on the road to knowledge" was the motto of the German-Chinese Year of Science and Education 2009/10, which took place from March 2009 to June 2010. German and Chinese came together at more than 200 events, which included the Lindau Nobel Laureate Meeting and the BMBF's participation in Shenyang and Wuhan on the topic of "sustainable urban development" during the campaign "Germany and China – Moving Ahead Together".

=== German-Brazilian Year of Science, Technology and Innovation 2010/11 ===
Events in the field of science were held in Germany and Brazil from April 2010 to April 2011. The slogan of the events was "sustainable:innovative". More than 100 events took place, including 60 'best practice' projects. It included the Brazil Week at Münster University, the "Eye of the Sky" touring exhibition of the German Aerospace Center (DLR) and a promotional tour through Brazil. The German-Brazilian Year launched the foundation of an agricultural research laboratory at the Brazilian Agricultural Research Corporation (EMBRAPA) under the umbrella of the Helmholtz Research Centre Jülich.

=== German-Russian Year of Education, Science and Innovation 2011/12 ===
The German-Russian Year slogan was "Partnership of Ideas". More than 200 events were held between May 2011 and May 2012. Eighteen select German universities hosted "Russia Weeks". The Russia country campaign runs from 2012 to 2014 as part of the "Promoting Innovation in Germany" initiative under the umbrella of "Research in Germany".

=== German-South African Year of Science 2012/2013 ===
The German-South African Year of Science slogan was "Enhancing Science Partnerships for Innovation and Sustainable Development". The ministries of the two countries sponsored 41 projects; lecture series were also held. The establishment of a joint research chair was agreed at the end of the Science Year.
