= W. Alden Spencer Award =

Neuroscience prize

- Date: 1978
- Country: United States
- Website: Website

The W. Alden Spencer Award is awarded to an investigator in recognition of outstanding research contributions by the College of Physicians and Surgeons, the Department of Neuroscience, and The Kavli Institute for Brain Science at Columbia University. It is named after W. Alden Spencer, a professor of Physiology and Neurology at Columbia University. The award winner also gives a lecture. In 2018, it took place at on October 9, 2018. Since 2018, the award transitioned to a biennial schedule, alternating with the Eric R. Kandel Lecture, providing a platform for honoring developing talent in the field. Although the prize is only limited to the neuroscience field ,as of October 2026, out of 65 recipients 12（about18%) have subsequentry received Nobel Prize in Physiology or Medicine (10) or Nobel Prize in Chemistry (2). It is considered one of the notable precursors to future Nobel accolades. ( ) indicates award year and the field of Nobel Prize.

== Recipients ==
- 1978 Emilio Bizzi
- 1979 Charles F. Stevens
- 1980 John Heuser, Thomas Reese
- 1981 Gerald Fischbach
- 1982 Patricia Goldman-Rakic
- 1983 Erwin Neher(1991 Nobel Prize in Physiology or Medicine), Bert Sakmann(1991 Physiology or Medicine)
- 1984 Paul H. Patterson
- 1985 A.J. Hudspeth
- 1986 H. Robert Horvitz(2002 Physiology or Medicine), John Sulston(2002 physiology or Medicine)
- 1987 Robert H. Wurtz
- 1988 Lily Yeh Jan, Yuh Nung Jan
- 1989 Holger Wigstrom, Bengt Gustafsson, Roger Nicoll
- 1990 Michael P. Stryker
- 1991 Roger Y. Tsien(2008 Nobel Prize in Chemistry)
- 1992 Corey S. Goodman
- 1993 Richard H. Scheller, Thomas C. Südhof(2013 Physiology or Medicine)
- 1994 Richard A. Andersen, William T. Newsome III
- 1995 Richard W. Aldrich, Christopher Miller
- 1996 Carla Shatz
- 1997 Cornelia Bargmann
- 1998 Roderick MacKinnon(2003 Chemistry)
- 1999 David Anderson
- 2000 Joshua Sanes
- 2001 Joseph Takahashi
- 2002 Eric Knudsen, Charles Gilbert
- 2003 Huda Zoghbi
- 2004 Thomas R. Insel, Emmanuel Mignot
- 2005 Edvard Moser(2014 Physiology or Medicine), May-Britt Moser(2014 Physiology or Medicine)
- 2006 Winfried Denk, David W. Tank
- 2007 David Julius (2021 Physiology or Medicine), Charles G. Zuker
- 2008 Nikos K. Logothetis
- 2009 Michael N. Shadlen
- 2010 S. Lawrence Zipursky, Marc Tessier-Lavigne
- 2011 Karl Deisseroth(2026 Physiology or Medicine)
- 2012 Allison J. Doupe, Michael S. Brainard
- 2013 Eric Gouaux
- 2015 Atsushi Miyawaki, Loren L. Looger
- 2016 Winrich Freiwald, Doris Y. Tsao
- 2017 Ardem Patapoutian(2021 Physiology or Medicine), David Ginty
- 2018 Silvia Arber and Botond Roska
- 2022 Leslie Vosshall
- 2024 Vivek Jayaraman, Gaby Maimon
- 2026 Stephen D. Liberles,Scott M Stenson

== See also ==
- The Kavli Prize
- The Brain Prize
- Gruber Prize in Neuroscience
- Karl Spencer Lashley Award
- The Mind & Brain Prize
- Perl-UNC Prize
- Ralph W. Gerard Prize in Neuroscience
- List of neuroscience awards
