= Horace Winchell Magoun =

Horace Winchell Magoun (June 23, 1907 – March 6, 1991) was a medical researcher.

studied medicine first at the Rhode Island State College and the Syracuse University, graduating in medicine in 1931. In 1934 earned a Ph.D. in anatomy at the Faculty of Medicine Northwestern University, and remained in it first as a university assistant (1934–1937) and then as professor of microscopic anatomy (1937–1950). In 1948, in collaboration with the Italian neurophysiologist Giuseppe Moruzzi, Magoun identified the brain center responsible for the state of sleep: electrical stimulation of the brain stem, by Moruzzi and Magoun found a link between the station cerebellum and motor cortex, producing EEG waves typical of a state of intense supervision. With further investigation showed that both the deep brain stimulation of this structure, which they named "reticular formation", caused the awakening of the animal, while its destruction made him fall into a coma permanent. With this guide "classic". Are considered "classics" those works that have been cited in over 400 scientific papers and Moruzzi Magoun laid the foundations for studying the physiology of sleep.

Magoun took part in numerous projects and research in anatomy and physiology was one of the fathers of the neuroscience, the multidisciplinary approach to the study of nervous system. In 1962 Horace Magounsi moved to 'University of California at Los Angeles as professor of anatomy and as a result of psychiatry. In California, besides the study of the factors that control sleep and waking, Magoun was interested in neuroendocrinology, showing among other things, the important role of the hypothalamus. In 1963, he published an essay (The waking brain) which summed up its work on the neuroendocrinology. He also served as the 40th president of the American Association of Anatomists from 1963 to 1964.

== Awards ==
- In 1970, he was awarded the Karl Spencer Lashley Award.
- In 1988, he was awarded the Ralph W. Gerard Prize in Neuroscience.
