= Elwin Marg =

American optometrist and neuroscientist

- Born: March 23, 1918; Saint Louis, Missouri, U.S.
- Died: July 15, 2010 (aged 92); Berkeley, California, U.S.
- Education: University of California at Berkeley
- Known for: Electrooculogram; Mackay-Marg Tonometer; Minerva Foundation
- Scientific career
- Fields: Neuroscience; Optometry
- Workplaces: University of California at Berkeley

Elwin Marg (March 23, 1918 – July 15, 2010) was an American optometrist and neuroscientist at the University of California at Berkeley. He was the first to receive a PhD from UC Berkeley School of Optometry. It was he who gave the name electrooculogram, a technique for measurement of nerve impulse in the eye.

He developed an improved tonometer that avoided use of anaesthetics for the first time in optometrical diagnosis. With his wife he established a non-profit neuroscience organisation, the Minerva Foundation in 1983.

== Early life and education ==
Elwin Marg studied at the School of Optometry of the UC Berkeley. He entered an undergraduate course in 1938. In 1940, he received an AB in physiological optometry and a Certificate in Optometry. He completed PhD in 1950.

== Professional career ==
During the Second World War, Elwin Marg served as a communications officer in the U.S. Air Force with postings in Ireland, Tunisia, and Italy. During the Korean War he was reinstated for research at Wright-Patterson Air Force Base in Dayton, Ohio. He availed two sabbatical leaves at the Nobel Institute of Neurophysiology, Karolinska Institute, Stockholm, working with Ragnar Granit, future Nobel laureate, in 1956 and 1964, the latter under a Guggenheim Fellowship. He spent the rest of his career at UC Berkeley till his retirement in 1988. First as an instructor in optometry in 1950, then as an assistant professor of physiological optics and optometry in 1951, an associate professor in 1956, and finally full professor in 1962. He published 99 technical papers in various areas.

In collaboration with R. Stuart Mackay, an electrical engineer at UC Berkeley, he completed a design of tonometer, a device for measuring intraocular pressure, in 1959. This groundbreaking instrument was named Mackay-Marg Tonometer, after the developers. This new tool did not require an anaesthetic and thus, for the first time, allowed optometrists to measure intraocular pressure more conveniently.

In 1951 Marg described and named electrooculogram for a technique of measuring the resting potential of the retina in the human eye.

== Personal life ==
Elwin Marg died in Berkeley in 2010, survived by his daughter Tamia Marg Anderson. His wife Helen had predeceased him in 2001.

== Awards and honours ==
- Guggenheim Fellowship in 1963.
- Apollo Award of the American Optometric Association in 1962
- Glenn Fry Award of the American Academy of Optometry in 1972
- Elected fellow of the American Association for the Advancement of Science
- Elected fellow of the American Academy of Optometry
- Charles F. Prentice Medal of the American Academy of Optometry in 1981
- Berkeley Optometry Alumnus of the Year in 1993
- Inducted into the Berkeley Optometry Hall of Fame in 2002
