= Susumu Hagiwara =

American neuroscientist (1922–1989)

Susumu Hagiwara 萩原生長
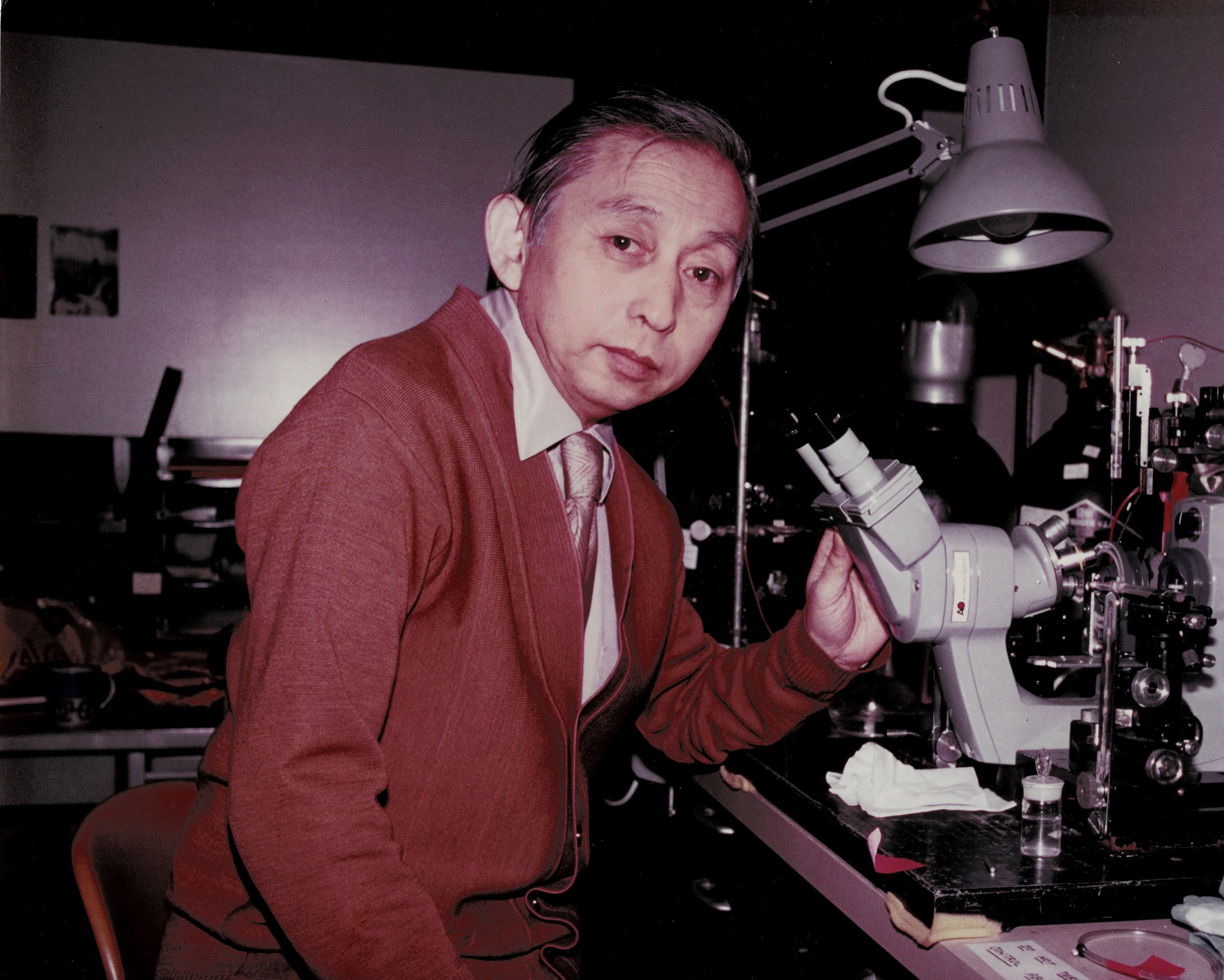
- Born: November 6, 1922; Hokkaido, Japan
- Died: April 1, 1989 (aged 66); Los Angeles, California
- Education: University of Tokyo
- Spouse: Satoko Hagiwara
- Awards: Kenneth S. Cole Award; Ralph Gerard Prize; Order of the Rising Sun
- Scientific career
- Fields: Neuroscience
- Workplaces: Tokyo Medical and Dental University; University of California, San Diego; University of California, Los Angeles

Susumu Hagiwara (Japanese: 萩原 生長; November 6, 1922 – April 1, 1989) was a Japanese-born American physician and neuroscientist.

Hagiwara was born and raised in Hokkaido, Japan, attending the University of Tokyo for his M.D. and Ph.D. degrees. He became a professor at the Tokyo Medical and Dental University before migrating to the United States to serve as professor for both the University of California, San Diego and University of California, Los Angeles.

The Los Angeles Times called Hagiwara "a pioneer in understanding the mechanisms of excitability in nerve and muscle cells". University of California called him the world's "most distinguished neuroscientist".

Dr. Kenneth Shine, dean of the UCLA School of Medicine, said: "Susumu Hagiwara revolutionized our understanding of how calcium moves across cell membranes, basic discoveries which lead [sic] to the calcium-blocking agents currently used to treat patients with heart disease, migraine and stroke".

Hagiwara was a member of the National Academy of Sciences. He was also a member of the American Academy of Arts and Sciences, a recipient of the Kenneth Cole Award of the Biophysical Society, a holder of an honorary doctorate from the Universite Pierre et Marie Curie in Paris, a recipient of the Ralph W. Gerard Prize in Neuroscience of the Society for Neuroscience and, posthumously, the Order of the Rising Sun from the Japanese government.

Hagiwara died of a heart attack at his Los Angeles home on April 1, 1989.
