= Bert Sakmann =

German Nobel laureate

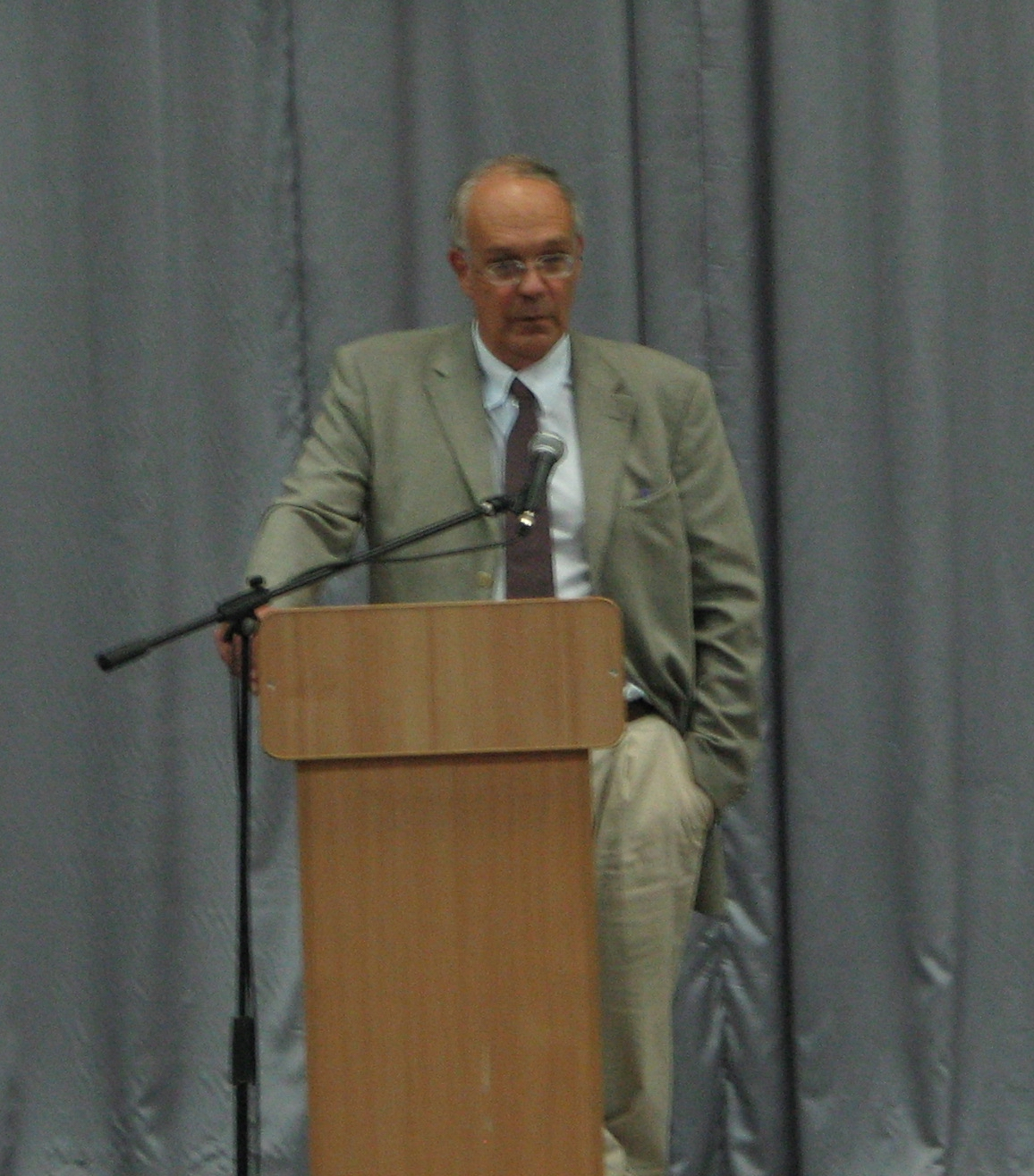
- Born: 12 June 1942 (age 84); Stuttgart, German Reich
- Awards: W. Alden Spencer Award (1983); Louisa Gross Horwitz Prize (1986); Louis-Jeantet Prize for Medicine (1988); Harvey Prize (1991); Nobel Prize for Physiology or Medicine (1991); ForMemRS (1994)
- Scientific career
- Workplaces: Max Planck Institute of Neurobiology; University College London
- Website: www.neuro.mpg.de/sakmann

Bert Sakmann (German pronunciation: [ˈbɛʁt ˈzakˌman]; born 12 June 1942) is a German cell physiologist. He shared the Nobel Prize in Physiology or Medicine with Erwin Neher in 1991 for their work on "the function of single ion channels in cells," and the invention of the patch clamp. Bert Sakmann was Professor at Heidelberg University and is an emeritus scientific member of the Max Planck Institute for Medical Research in Heidelberg, Germany. Since 2008 he leads an emeritus research group at the Max Planck Institute of Neurobiology.

== Life and career ==
Sakmann was born in Stuttgart, the son of Annemarie (née Schaefer), a physical therapist, and Bertold Sakmann, a theater director. Sakmann enrolled in Volksschule in Lindau, and completed the Wagenburg gymnasium in Stuttgart in 1961. He studied medicine from 1967 onwards in Tübingen, Freiburg, Berlin, Paris and Munich. After completing his medical exams at LMU Munich, he became a medical assistant in 1968 at LMU Munich, while also working as a scientific assistant (Wissenschaftlicher Assistent) at Munich's Max-Planck-Institut für Psychiatrie, in the Neurophysiology Department under Otto Detlev Creutzfeldt. In 1971, he moved to University College London, where he worked in the Department of Biophysics under Bernard Katz. In 1974, he completed his medical dissertation, under the title Elektrophysiologie der neuralen Helladaptation in der Katzenretina (Electrophysiology of Neural Light Adaption in the Cat Retina) in the Medical Faculty of Göttingen University.

Afterwards (still in 1974), Sakmann returned to the lab of Otto Creutzfeldt, who had meanwhile moved to the Max Planck Institute for Biophysical Chemistry in Göttingen. Sakmann joined the membrane biology group in 1979.

In 1990, he accepted a position at the Faculty of Natural Science Medicine at Heidelberg University. One year later, he became a full university professor at the Faculty of Biology in Heidelberg.

On 2 June 2009, Peter Gruss, the president of the Max Planck Society, announced that Sakmann would serve as the scientific director of the Max Planck Florida Institute, the organization's biomedical research facility at Florida Atlantic University in Jupiter, Florida.

Sakmann is the founder of the Bert-Sakmann-Stiftung.

== Awards and honors ==
In 1983, Sakmann and Erwin Neher were awarded the W. Alden Spencer Award and in 1986 the Louisa Gross Horwitz Prize both from Columbia University. In 1987, he received the Gottfried Wilhelm Leibniz Prize of the Deutsche Forschungsgemeinschaft, which is the highest honour awarded in German research. In 1991, he received the Ralph W. Gerard Prize in Neuroscience, the Harvey Prize and the Nobel Prize in Physiology or Medicine along with Neher, with whom he had worked in Göttingen. In 1993 he became a member of the German Academy of Sciences Leopoldina. He was elected a Foreign Member of the Royal Society (ForMemRS) in 1994.
