= Gruber Prize in Neuroscience =

The Gruber Prize in Neuroscience
- Awarded for: Discoveries that have advanced the understanding of the nervous system
- Location: Yale University Office of Development, New Haven, Connecticut
- Presented by: Gruber Foundation
- Reward: US$500,000
- First award: 2004
- Website: gruber.yale.edu

The Gruber Prize in Neuroscience, established in 2004, is one of three international awards of US$500,000 made by the Gruber Foundation, a non-profit organization based in Yale University in New Haven, Connecticut. It is awarded annually to scientists from around the world for significant discoveries that have enhanced the comprehension of the neurological system. The prize comprises the cash award, a gold medal engraved with the recipient's name, and a citation detailing the accomplishment for which they are being recognized.

The Gruber Prize in Neuroscience selection advisors are nominated by the Society for Neuroscience. The Foundation also award prizes in genetics and cosmology.

== Recipients ==
- 2004 Seymour Benzer
- 2005 Eric Knudsen and Masakazu Konishi
- 2006 Masao Ito and Roger Nicoll, cellular neurobiologists
- 2007 Shigetada Nakanishi a molecular neurobiologist, Director of the Osaka Bioscience Institute
- 2008 John O’Keefe, PhD, Professor of Cognitive Neuroscience at University College London
- 2009 Jeffrey C. Hall, professor of neurogenetics at the University of Maine; Michael Rosbash, professor and director of the National Center for Behavioral Genomics atBrandeis University; and Michael Young, professor and head of the Laboratory of Genetics at Rockefeller University
- 2010 Robert H. Wurtz, NIH Distinguished Investigator at the National Eye Institute Laboratory of Sensorimotor Research
- 2011 Huda Zoghbi
- 2012 Lily Jan and Yuh Nung Jan, University of California, San Francisco
- 2013 Eve Marder
- 2014 Thomas Jessell
- 2015 Carla Shatz and Michael Greenberg
- 2016 Mu-ming Poo, Institute of Neuroscience, Chinese Academy of Sciences and UC Berkeley
- 2017 Joshua R. Sanes, Center for Brain Neuroscience, Harvard University
- 2018 Ann Graybiel (McGovern Institute for Brain Research/MIT), Okihide Hikosaka (National Eye Institute/NIH) and Wolfram Schultz (University of Cambridge)
- 2019 Joseph S. Takahashi
- 2020 Friedrich Bonhoeffer, Corey Goodman and Marc Tessier-Lavigne
- 2021 Christine Petit and Christopher A. Walsh
- 2022 Larry Abbott, Emery Neal Brown, Terrence Sejnowski and Haim Sompolinsky
- 2023 Huda Akil
- 2024 Cornelia Bargmann and Gerald M. Rubin
- 2025 Edward F. Chang
- 2026: John Rubenstein

== See also ==
- The Brain Prize
- Golden Brain Award
- Kavli Prize in Neuroscience
- W. Alden Spencer Award
- Karl Spencer Lashley Award
- Mind & Brain Prize
- List of medicine awards
- List of neuroscience awards
