= Allison J. Doupe =

Canadian psychiatrist, biologist, and neuroscientist

Allison Jane Doupe
- Born: 1954; Montreal, Quebec, Canada
- Died: 24 October 2014 (aged 59–60)
- Education: McGill University, Harvard University
- Occupation: Neurobiology

Allison Jane Doupe (1954 – 24 October 2014) was a Canadian psychiatrist, biologist, and neuroscientist. She is best known for her pioneering work in avian neurobiology that linked birdsong to human language, showing that birds and humans learn to communicate in similar ways. In 2014, Doupe was awarded the Pradel Research Award by the National Academy of Sciences for her work on neural circuits and information processing in songbirds, which she pioneered as a model species for studying learning and memory.

== Life ==
After graduating from McGill University, Doupe obtained her MD and PhD in Neurobiology from Harvard University. She joined the University of California, San Francisco Departments of Psychiatry and Physiology in 1993 as an assistant professor, and was promoted to full professor in 2000.

In 2008 she was elected as a fellow of the American Academy of Arts and Sciences.

She died on 24 October 2014, of cancer.

== Publications ==
Doupe, Allison J.; Kuhl, Patricia K. (March 1999). "BIRDSONG AND HUMAN SPEECH: Common Themes and Mechanisms". Annual Review of Neuroscience. 22: 567–631. doi:10.1146/annurev.neuro.22.1.567. PMID 10202549.

Brainard, Michael S.; Doupe, Allison J. (April 13, 2000). "Interruption of a basal ganglia–forebrain circuit prevents plasticity of learned vocalizations". Nature. 404 (6779): 762–766. Bibcode:2000Natur.404..762B. doi:10.1038/35008083. PMID 10783889. S2CID 4413588.

Kojima, Satoshi; Kao, Mimi H.; Doupe, Allison J. (19 March 2013). "Task-related "cortical" bursting depends critically on basal ganglia input and is linked to vocal plasticity". PNAS. 110 (12): 4756–4761. Bibcode:2013PNAS..110.4756K. doi:10.1073/pnas.1216308110. PMC 3607039. PMID 23449880.

== Awards ==
- 1993 Klingenstein Fellowship
- 1993 Searle Scholarship
- 2012 W. Alden Spencer Award
- 2013 Cozzarelli Prize by PNAS
- 2014 Pradel Research Award by the National Academy of Sciences
