= Clinton N. Woolsey =

American neuroscientist

Coat of Arms of Clinton N. Woolsey

Clinton Nathan Woolsey (November 30, 1904 – January 14, 1993) was an American neuroscientist notable for mapping the brain and exploring the location and inner workings of touch, hearing, and vision.

Woolsey was the son of Joseph Woodhull and Mathilda Louise Aicholz Woolsey.

He was the Charles Sumner Slichter Emeritus Professor of Neurophysiology and professor at the University of Wisconsin–Madison, a member of the National Academy of Sciences, a founder of Waisman Center on Mental Retardation and Human Development at the University of Wisconsin–Madison.

== Awards ==
- In 1982 he was awarded the Ralph W. Gerard Prize in Neuroscience.
