= Mind & Brain Prize =

Award in cognitive sciences

The Mind & Brain Prize was established in 2003 and aims at honouring the most relevant researchers in the field of cognitive science, as well as to recognize outstanding achievement in advancing knowledge about mind and brain by persons whose work contributed to the growth and development of the discipline. It is awarded by the University and Polytechnic of Turin.

== Laureates ==
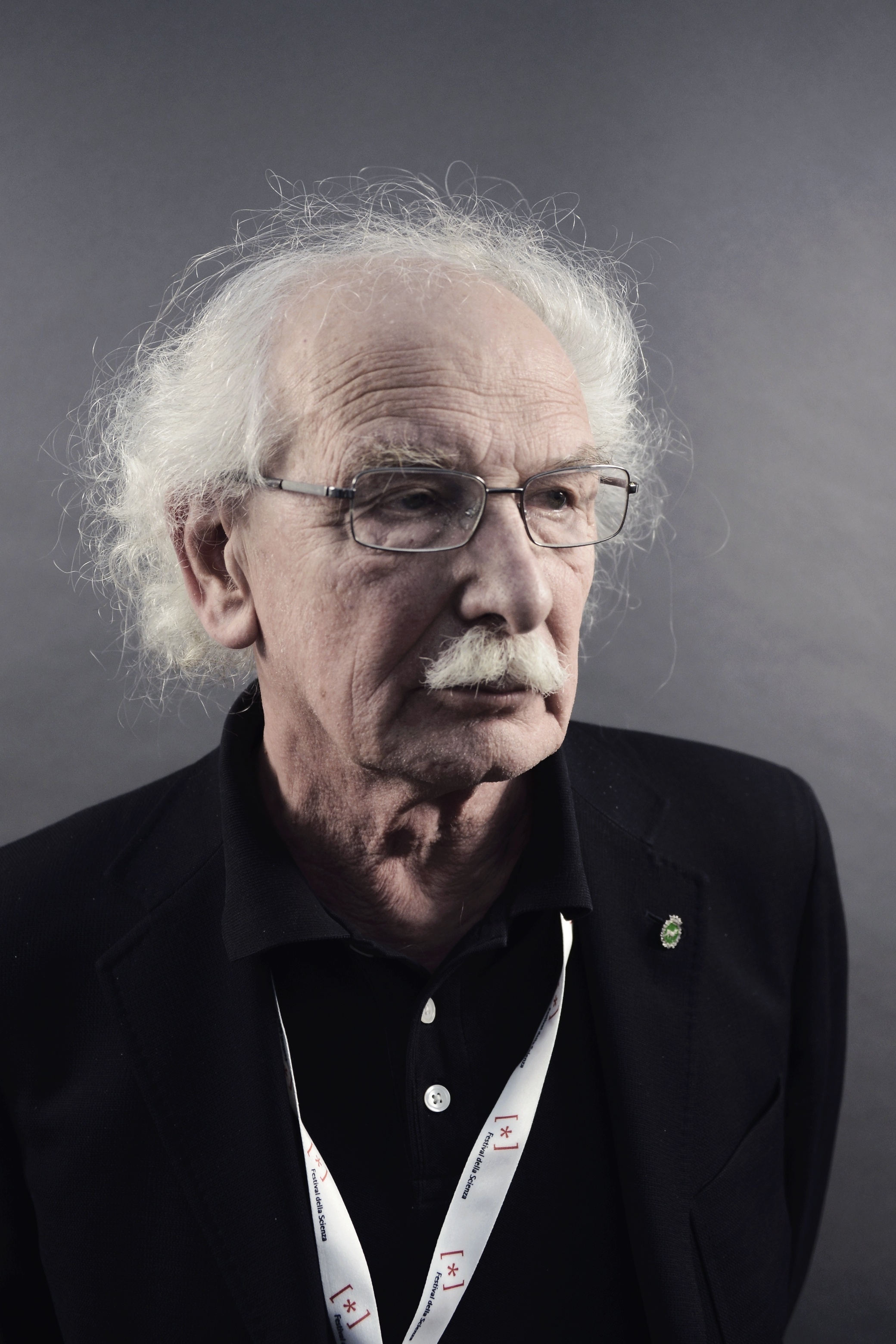
Giacomo Rizzolatti, first Mind & Brain Prize laureate

- 2003 – Giacomo Rizzolatti, Domenico Parisi
- 2004 – Philip Johnson-Laird, Carlo Umiltà, Mariateresa Molo
- 2005 – Jerry A. Fodor, James L. McClelland
- 2006 – John R. Searle, Giovanni Liotti, Andrea Comba
- 2007 – Michael Tomasello, Cristiano Castelfranchi, Il Sole 24 Ore
- 2008 – Jon Kabat-Zinn, Giorgio Rezzonigo, Fondazione Cavalieri Ottolenghi
- 2009 – Dan Sperber, Jacques Mehler, Tuttoscienze
- 2010 – Uta Frith
- 2011 – Daniel Dennett
- 2013 – Tim Shallice
- 2014 – Stanislas Dehaene
- 2015 – Nicholas Humphrey
- 2016 – Antonio Damasio

== See also ==
- The Brain Prize also known as the Grete Lundbeck European Brain Research Prize
- The Kavli Prize
- Golden Brain Award
- Gruber Prize in Neuroscience
- List of psychology awards
- W. Alden Spencer Award
- Ralph W. Gerard Prize in Neuroscience
