= Masao Ito =

Japanese neuroscientist (1928–2018)

Order of Culture Masao Itō
- 伊藤 正男
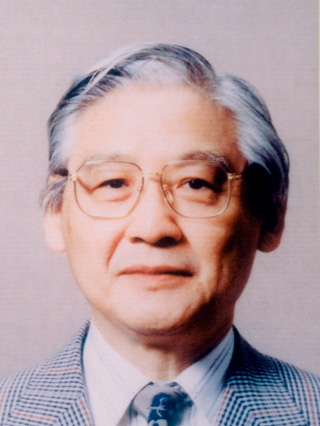
- Masao Itō
- Born: December 4, 1928; Nagoya, Japan
- Died: December 18, 2018 (aged 90)
- Education: University of Tokyo
- Awards: Japan Academy Prize (1986); Japan Prize (1996); Gruber Prize in Neuroscience (2006)
- Scientific career
- Fields: Neuroscience

Masao Ito (伊藤 正男, Itō Masao; December 4, 1928 – December 18, 2018) was a Japanese neuroscientist, and director of the Riken Brain Science Institute.

== Overviews ==
Masao Ito was the main force behind Japanese neuroscience and its international recognition for many years. He was very active in the International Brain Research Organisation (IBRO) and went on to establish the Federation of Asian-Oceanian Neuroscience Societies (FAONS) in an effort to join together East Asian neuroscientists and facilitate interactions without dependence on American/European influences. This organisation is still active and acts in concert with IBRO's own Asia-Pacific Regional Committee which was set up in 1999. His roles in international scientific diplomacy, raising funds for neuroscience in the region and establishing the Riken Brain Science Institute were pivotal in promoting neuroscience throughout the East Asian countries.

He won the 2006 Gruber Prize in Neuroscience and the 1996 Japan Prize. He was elected a Foreign Member of the Royal Society in 1992.

== Life ==
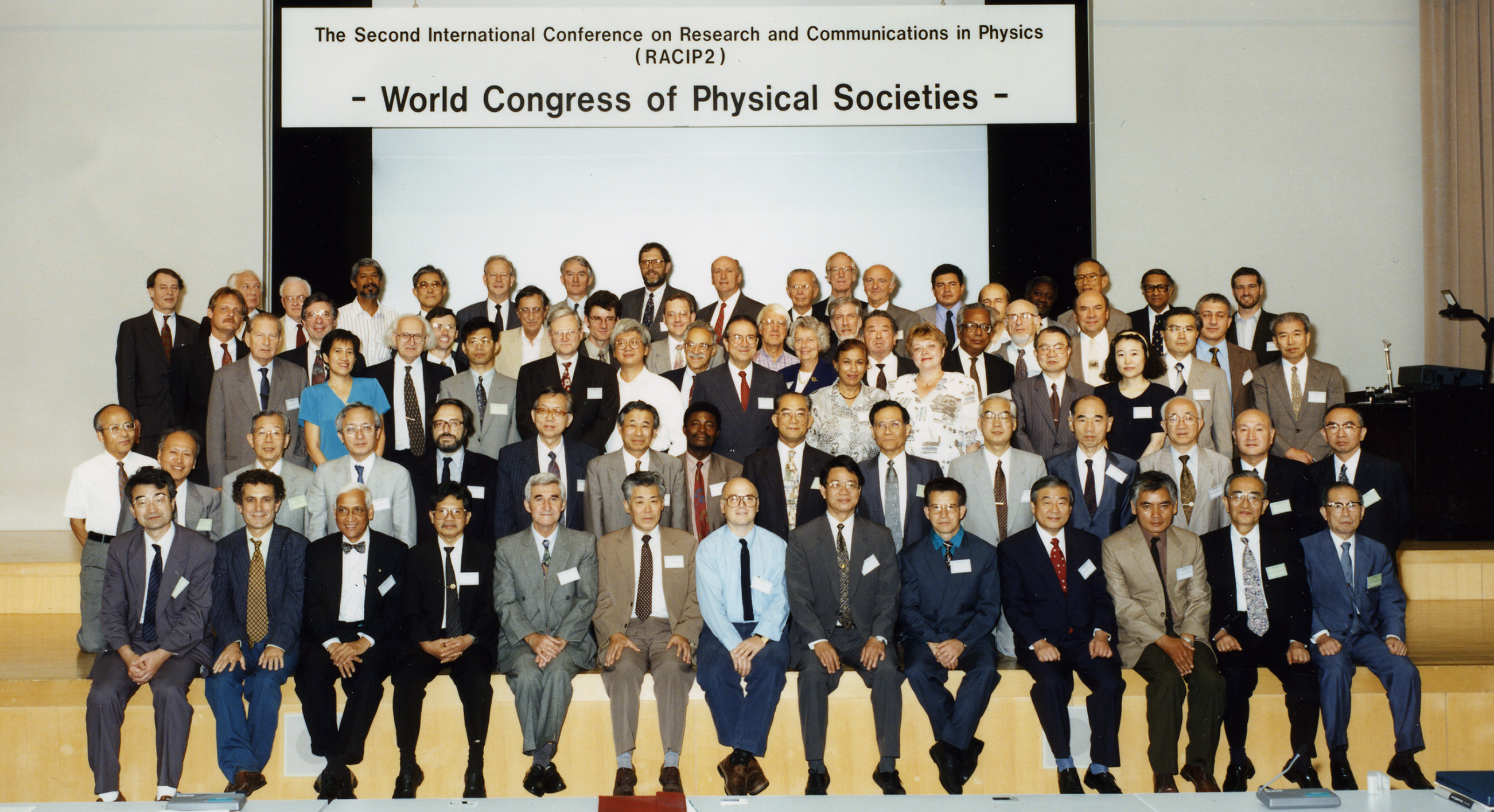
Ito at the Second International Conference on Research and Communications in Physics

Ito graduated from the University of Tokyo with an M.D. in 1953 and a Ph.D. in 1959. He was a research fellow at Australian National University from 1959 to 1962. He taught at the University of Tokyo from 1963.

Ito died on 18 December 2018 at the age of 90.
