= Tirin Moore =

American neuroscientist

- Born: June 12, 1969 (age 57); Oakland, California
- Education: Princeton University; California State University, Chico
- Scientific career
- Workplaces: Stanford University; Howard Hughes Medical Institute; Massachusetts Institute of Technology
- Thesis: Studies of residual visual function after damage to striate cortex in infant and adult monkeys (1995)
- Website: Moore Lab Stanford

Tirin Moore (born June 12, 1969) is an American neuroscientist who is a Professor of Neurobiology at Stanford University and Investigator at the Howard Hughes Medical Institute. He is known for his work on the neural mechanisms of visual perception, visually guided behavior and cognition. He was elected to the American Academy of Arts and Sciences and to the National Academy of Sciences in 2021.

== Early life and education ==
Moore was born in Oakland, California. He was an undergraduate student at California State University, Chico. Moore was awarded a National Science Foundation Graduate Fellowship in the laboratory of Charles Gross at Princeton University, where he studied residual visual function after damage to striate cortex. Moore moved to Massachusetts Institute of Technology (MIT) for his postdoctoral research, where he worked with Peter H. Schiller. There he studied the modulation of visual cortical signals during eye movements. He returned to Princeton, where he started studying neural mechanisms of visual attention (i.e. the tendency of visual processing to be confined largely to stimuli that are relevant to behavior).

== Research and career ==
Moore was appointed to the faculty at Stanford University in 2003. He investigates the neural circuits that underlie visual perception, visually guided behavior and cognition. He studies the integration of visual and motor signals, and particularly the influence of motor preparation on visual processing.
Moore showed that visual spatial attention is causally linked to the neurons in prefrontal cortex that control gaze, specifically within the frontal eye fields. His lab also discovered that dopamine transmission in prefrontal cortex regulates prefrontal influence on visual processing in posterior cortex and provided the first evidence of a causal role of posterior parietal cortex in stimulus-driven visual attention.
In the early 2000s, Moore, Michael Graziano and Charlotte Taylor discovered a map of complex movements in motor and premotor cortex.

== Awards and honors ==
- 2005 American Physiological Society Alumni Achievement Award
- 2009 National Academy of Sciences Troland Award
- 2014 Investigator at the Howard Hughes Medical Institute
- 2018 Elected to the National Academy of Medicine
- 2021 National Academy of Sciences Pradel Research Award
- 2021 Elected to the National Academy of Sciences
- 2021 Elected to the American Academy of Arts and Sciences
- 2021 Golden Brain Award
