= Nobuo Suga =

Japanese biologist

- Born: December 17, 1933 (age 92); Kobe, Japan
- Education: Tokyo Metropolitan University; Tokyo Medical and Dental University
- Scientific career
- Fields: Biology
- Workplaces: Washington University in St. Louis
- Doctoral advisor: Yatsuji Katsuki

Nobuo Suga (born December 17, 1933) is a Japanese biologist noted for his research on the neurophysiology of hearing, and echolocation in bats.

== Life ==
After earning a bachelor's degree in biology at Tokyo Metropolitan University in 1958, Nobuo studied for his doctoral thesis on the neurophysiology of hearing with Yatsuji Katsuki at the Tokyo Medical and Dental University. His early research attracted the attention of Vincent Wigglesworth of Cambridge University, a prominent insect researcher, and Donald Griffin of Harvard University, who studied bats. From there, his career took him to University of California, Los Angeles and UC San Diego School of Medicine, before finally arriving at Washington University in St. Louis. Suga became a U.S. citizen in 1993, prompted by an incident at St. Louis Lambert International Airport where a customs agent couldn't recognize Suga's picture on his green card, issued in 1966.

== Work ==
Suga's work revealed much about the location and function of auditory system in the brain. Whilst at Washington University in St. Louis, he mapped the areas of the bat brain involved in processing Doppler shift (velocity) information, and in processing distance information for echolocation. His recent work has focused on the plasticity of the auditory system mediated by cortico-cortical interactions and corticofugal feedback.

== Selected publications ==
- Suga, N. and Ma, X. (2003) Multiparametric corticofugal modulation and plasticity in the auditory system. Nature Rev. Neurosci. 4: 783–794.
- Xiao, Z. and Suga, N. (2004) Reorganization of the auditory cortex specialized for echo-delay processing in the mustached bat. Proc. Natl. Acad. Sci. USA 101: 1769–1774.
- Xiao, Z. and Suga, N. (2005) Asymmetry in corticofugal modulation of frequency-tuning in mustached bat auditory system. Proc. Natl. Acad. Sci. 102: 19162–19167.
- Ma, X. and Suga, N. (2005) Long-term plasticity evoked by electric stimulation and acetylcholine applied to the auditory cortex. Proc. Natl. Acad. Sci. 102: 9335–9340.
- Ji, W., Suga, N. and Gao, E. (2005) Effects of agonists and antagonists of NMDA and ACh receptors on plasticity of bat auditory system elicited by fear conditioning. J. Neurophysiol. 94: 1199–1211.

== Honors and awards ==
- 1992: Membership of the American Academy of Arts and Sciences
- 1998: Membership of the United States National Academy of Sciences
- 2003: Membership of the Academy of Sciences in St. Louis
- 2004: Ralph W. Gerard Prize in Neuroscience
