= Wade Marshall =

American neuroscientist

Wade Marshall (1907–1972) was a neuroscientist, noted for his work along with Philip Bard on producing the first map of the somatotopic organization of the cerebral cortex while working at the Johns Hopkins University. He went from Johns Hopkins to work at the National Institutes of Health (NIMH), where, in 1954, he became the inaugural leader of the Laboratory of Neurophysiology at NIMH, a position he retained until his retirement. He was regarded as a pioneer in brain electrophysiology and became internationally known for mapping the somatosensory system of the cat and monkey and the visual cortex of the cat.
