= Stephen Lisberger =

American neurobiologist

- Born: New York City
- Spouse: Chieko (m. 1992)

Academic background
- Education: A.B., Mathematics, 1971, Cornell University; PhD, Physiology, 1976, University of Washington
- Thesis: Responses of flocculus purkinje cells and mossy fibers during smooth eye movements evoked by visual and vestibular stimuli in behaving monkey (1976)

Academic work
- Institutions: Duke University School of Medicine; University of California, San Francisco

Stephen Gates Lisberger is an American neurobiologist. He is the George Barth Geller Distinguished Professor for Research and chair of Neurobiology at the Duke University School of Medicine.

== Early life and education ==
Lisberger was born in New York City and grew up in Stamford, Connecticut and Ithaca, New York. While attending Ithaca High School, Lisberger participated in the 1967 Annual High School Mathematics Contest where he placed in the top one per cent of scorers than any other Upstate school. After graduating in 1967, Lisberger received his Bachelor of Arts in Mathematics from Cornell University in 1971 and his PhD in Physiology at the University of Washington.

== Career ==
Upon receiving his PhD, Lisberger conducted postdoctoral work at the National Institutes of Health before accepting a faculty position in the Department of Physiology at the University of California, San Francisco (UCSF). As a professor at UCSF, Lisberger led a research team who used the vestibulo-ocular reflex to understand how certain brain cells learn behavior. In 2001, he collaborated with Masaki Tanaka to understand whether the frontal pursuit area of the motor cortex was involved in the brain’s motor cortex adjusts eye movement to track objects. They subsequently discovered that a region of the brain that was formerly believed to control eye movement is actually involved in the high-level planning of movement. He also became the founding director of the W.M. Keck Foundation Center for Theoretical Neurobiology and a co-director of the Sloan-Swartz Center for Theoretical Neurobiology at UCSF.

Throughout his tenure at UCSF, Lisberger's research on brains was often protested and critiqued for its use of monkeys. Animal rights groups argued that the study was unnecessary and was causing harm to the animals. In October 2000, UCSF suspended one study in his lab for two weeks while the Board of Supervisors investigated the animal abuse claims. Outside of the school, Lisberger was gaining national recognition for his research into brain mechanisms and visual movement. He received the 1986 Young Investigator Award from the Society of Neuroscience and was appointed Senior Editor for Systems/Behavior for The Journal of Neuroscience in 1999. In 2008, Lisberger was elected a Member of the American Academy of Arts and Sciences.

Lisberger eventually left UCSF in 2011 to become the chair of the Department of Neurobiology at Duke University School of Medicine. Upon joining the faculty, he was also appointed the George Barth Geller Professor for Research in Neurobiology. In 2020, Lisberger was elected a Fellow of the American Association for the Advancement of Science for "fundamental contributions to understanding of the organization and function of brain mechanisms that underlie sensorimotor learning, using visually-driven eye movements as a model system." A few years later, he was also elected a Member of the National Academy of Sciences for distinguished and continuing achievements in original research.

== Personal life ==
In 1992, Lisberger married Canadian artist Chieko Murasugi.
