= Robert Wurtz =

American neuroscientist

- Born: 28 March 1936 (age 90); Saint Louis, Missouri, United States
- Education: Oberlin College; University of Michigan, PhD
- Awards: Gruber Prize 2010; Gerard Prize 2006; Dan David Prize 2004; Lashley Award 1995; Golden Brain Award 1991; W. Alden Spencer Award 1987
- Scientific career
- Fields: Neuroscience; Physiology
- Workplaces: National Institute of Mental Health and National Eye Institute of National Institute of Health
- Thesis: Self-Stimulation and Escape in Response to Stimulation of the Rat Amygdala (1962)
- Doctoral advisor: James Olds
- Website: archived NIH website

Robert H. Wurtz is an American neuroscientist working as a NIH Distinguished Scientist and Chief of the Section on Visuomotor Integration at the National Eye Institute. He is a member of the US National Academy of Sciences and the American Academy of Arts and Sciences. He is recognized for developing methods for studying the visual system in "awake-behaving" primates (as opposed to those under anesthesia), a technique now widely used for the study of higher brain functions. He pioneered the study of the neuronal basis of vision and its relation with cognitive functions.

== Early life and education ==
Robert Wurtz was born in Saint Louis, Missouri and grew up in the nearby suburb of Webster Groves. He was the only child of Robert Henry Wurtz. His father was a factory superintendent for the Mavrakos Candy Company and his mother, Alice Edith (Popplewell), was a bookkeeper at the same company.

He had wanted to attend a liberal arts college, but his father persuaded him to apply to Oberlin College, from which he graduated in 1958, with a major in chemistry.

Wurtz developed an interest in experimental psychology and physiology of the nervous system, and subsequently studied psychology under James Olds at University of Michigan. He submitted his PhD thesis in 1962, despite that Olds was hesitant about the title, Self-Stimulation and Escape in Response to Stimulation of the Rat Amygdala. He continued post-doctoral research in the physiology department of Washington University in St. Louis.

== Professional career ==
In 1966, Wurtz joined the Laboratory of Neurobiology, National Institute of Mental Health, in Bethesda, Maryland. He began studies on the visual system of awake in monkeys and made groundbreaking works on neurobiology of vision and eye movements. During this time he spent a year (1975-1976) as a visiting scientist at the Physiological Laboratory at Cambridge University in England. He became the founding Chief of the Laboratory of Sensorimotor Research, National Eye Institute in 1978. In 2002, he stepped down as chief of the laboratory, but has remained as a senior investigator.

His 1969 publications became classic papers on this technique of studying the physiology of the visual system, and now used by cognitive neuroscientists around the world.

== Personal life ==
Robert Wurtz married Sally Smith, a fellow student at Oberlin, c. 1955. They have a son William and a daughter Erica.

== Award and recognition ==
- W. Alden Spencer Award, Columbia University (1987)
- Elected member of the National Academy of Sciences (1988)
- Elected member of the American Academy of Arts and Sciences (1990)
- President, Society for Neuroscience (1991)
- 1991 Golden Brain Award from Minerva Foundation
- Karl Spencer Lashley Award, American Philosophical Society (1995)
- Friedenwald Award, Association for Research in Vision and Ophthalmology (1996)
- Distinguished Scientific Contribution Award, American Psychological Association (1997)
- Institute of Medicine of the National Academy of Sciences (1997)
- Dan David Prize for the Future Time Dimension: “Brain Sciences” (2004)
- Ralph W. Gerard Prize in Neuroscience, Society for Neuroscience (2006)
- Honorary Doctor of Science, Oberlin College (2009)
- Grass Lecture, Society for Neuroscience (2009)
- Gruber Prize in Neuroscience (2010)
