= Eric Knudsen =

American professor of neurobiology

- Born: October 7, 1949; Palo Alto, California, United States
- Education: University of California, Santa Barbara (B.A., M.A.); University of California, San Diego (Ph.D.)
- Known for: Auditory system brain-mapping of the barn owl
- Awards: Lashey Award (2008); Gruber Prize in Neuroscience (2005); Troland Research Award (1988); Newcomb Cleveland Prize (1978)
- Scientific career
- Fields: Biology, Neuroscience
- Workplaces: Stanford University School of Medicine
- Thesis: Midbrain responses to electroreceptive input in catfish (1976)
- Doctoral advisor: Theodore H. Bullock

Eric Ingvald Knudsen is a professor of neurobiology at Stanford University School of Medicine, where he also served as chairman during 2001–2006. He is best known for his discovery, along with Masakazu Konishi, of a brain map of sound location in two dimensions in the barn owl, tyto alba. His work has contributed to the understanding of information processing in the auditory system of the barn owl, the plasticity of the auditory space map in developing and adult barn owls, the influence of auditory and visual experience on the space map, and more recently, mechanisms of attention and learning. He is a recipient of the Lashley Award, the Gruber Prize in Neuroscience, and the Newcomb Cleveland Prize and is a member of the National Academy of Sciences.

== Biography ==
Knudsen attended UC, Santa Barbara, earning a B.A. in Zoology followed by an M.A. in Neuroscience. He earned a Ph. D. at UC, San Diego in 1976, working under Theodore H. Bullock. Knudsen was a post-doctoral fellow with Konishi at California Institute of Technology from 1976 to 1979. He has been a professor at the Stanford University School of Medicine since 1988 and was chair of the Neuroscience department of the School of Medicine, from 2001 to 2006.

== Sound map of the barn owl co-discovery ==
In 1978, Knudsen and Konishi presented the discovery of an auditory map of space in the midbrain of the barn owl. This discovery was groundbreaking because it unearthed the first non-somatotopic space map in the brain. The map was found in the owl's midbrain, in the lateral and anterior mesencephalicus lateralis dorsalis (MLD), a structure now referred to as the inferior colliculus. Unlike most sound-localization maps, this map was found to be two-dimensional, with units arranged spatially to represent both the vertical and horizontal location of sound. Knudsen and Konishi discovered that units in this structure respond preferentially to sounds originating in a particular region in space.

In the 1978 paper, elevation and azimuth (location in the horizontal plane) were shown to be the two coordinates of the map. Using a speaker set on a rotatable hemispherical track, Knudsen and Konishi presented owls with auditory stimulus from various locations in space and recorded the resulting neuronal activity. They found that neurons in this part of the MLD were organized according to the location of their receptive field, with azimuth varying along the horizontal plane of the space map and elevation varying vertically.

Knudsen followed this discovery with research into specific sound localization mechanisms. Two main auditory cues used by the barn owl to localize sound are interaural time difference (ITD) and interaural intensity difference (IID). The owl's ears are asymmetric, with the right ear's opening being directed higher than that of the left. This asymmetry allows the barn owl to determine the elevation of a sound by comparing sound levels between its two ears. Interaural time differences provide the owl with information regarding a sound’s azimuth; sound will reach the ear closer to the sound source before reaching the farther ear, and this time difference can be detected and interpreted as an azimuthal direction. At low frequencies, the wavelength of a sound is wider than the owl's facial ruff, and the ruff does not affect detection of azimuth. At high frequencies, the ruff plays a role in reflecting sound for heightened sensitivity to vertical elevation. Therefore, with wide-band noise, containing both high and low frequencies, the owl could use interaural spectrum difference to obtain information about both azimuth and elevation. In 1979, Knudsen and Konishi showed that the barn owl uses interaural spectrum information in sound localization. They presented owls with both wide-bandwidth noise and pure tones. The birds were able to successfully locate pure tones (since they could still gather information from IID and ITD), but their error rate was much lower when localizing wide-bandwidth noise. This indicates that the birds utilize interaural spectrum differences to improve their accuracy.

Together with John Olsen and Steven Esterly, Knudsen studied the pattern of response to IID and ITD in the space map. They presented owls with sound stimuli while recordings were made from the optic tectum. Consistent with the previous findings regarding the organization of the optic tectum in terms of elevation and azimuth, they found that ITD varied primarily along the horizontal axis and IID along the vertical axis. However, the map according to elevation and azimuth does not line up perfectly with the ITD/IID map. Azimuth and ITD do not have a strictly linear relationship. In addition, IID is used not only to determine elevation of the sound source, but also, to a lesser degree, azimuth. Finally, IID and ITD are not the only two cues the owl uses to determine sound location, as shown by Knudsen's research into the effect of bandwidth on sound localization accuracy. Information from multiple types of cues is used to create the map of elevation and azimuth in the optic tectum.

== Sound map plasticity ==
At Stanford, Knudsen studied the plasticity of the auditory sound map, discovering that associations between the auditory cue values of the map and the locations in space that they represent can be altered by both auditory and visual experience.

Knudsen altered owls’ auditory cues by plugging one ear or removing the ruff feathers and preaural flaps. Initially this caused the birds to inaccurately judge sound source location, since the cues normally associated with each location in space had been changed. However, over time, the map shifted to restore a normal auditory sound map, aligned with the visual space map, despite the abnormal cues. New associations were formed between the abnormal cue values and the spatial locations they now represented, adjusting the map to translate the cues the bird was receiving into an accurate representation of its environment. This adjustment happens most rapidly and extensively in young birds. However, the map never perfectly reflects abnormal experience, even when cues are altered so early that the bird never experiences normal cues. This indicates that there is some innate “programming” of the map to reflect typical sensory experience.

In 1994, Knudsen disproved the idea that the auditory sound map is not long plastic in the adult bird; the plasticity appears to have a critical period. Earlier work had indicated that alteration of the sound map by experience was restricted to a period during development, and once this window of plasticity had passed, subsequent changes would not occur. In work done with Steven Esterly and John Olsen, he showed that adult animals retain plasticity, although to a lesser degree than younger animals. The adult auditory sound map is more readily altered if the bird was exposed to abnormal stimuli earlier in life, during a sensitive period. This shows that the owl’s brain forms functional connections during early abnormal experience which can be reactivated upon the return of abnormal stimuli.

== Sound map vision guides development ==
Knudsen's work has shown that vision is the dominant sense in changing the auditory sound map. Binocular displacing prisms were used to shift owls’ visual world, which resulted in a corresponding shift in the sound map. The disparity between the owls’ visual and auditory experience was reconciled by reinterpretation of auditory cues to match visual experience, even though the visual information was incorrect and the auditory was not. Even when other sensory information indicates to the owl that its visual input is misleading, this input exerts an apparently innate dominance over the other senses. In owls raised with displacing prisms, this persistent reliance on inaccurate information is particularly apparent: “Even though interaction with the environment from the beginning of life has proven to owls that their visual perception of stimulus source location is inaccurate, they nevertheless use vision to calibrate sound localization, which in this case leads to a gross error in sound localization”. This dominance does have limitations, however; in 1985, Eric Knudsen and Phyllis Knudsen conducted a study which showed that vision can alter the magnitude but not the sign of an auditory error.

While monaural occlusion and visual displacement both alter the associations between sensory cues and corresponding spatial locations, there are significant differences in the mechanisms at work: “The task under [the conditions of monaural occlusion] is to use vision[…]to assign abnormal combinations of cue values to appropriate locations in space. In contrast, prisms cause a relatively coherent displacement of visual space while leaving auditory cues essentially unchanged. The task under these conditions is to assign normal ranges and combinations of cue values to abnormal locations in space”.
