= Silvia Arber =

Swiss neurobiologist

Silvia Arber MAE
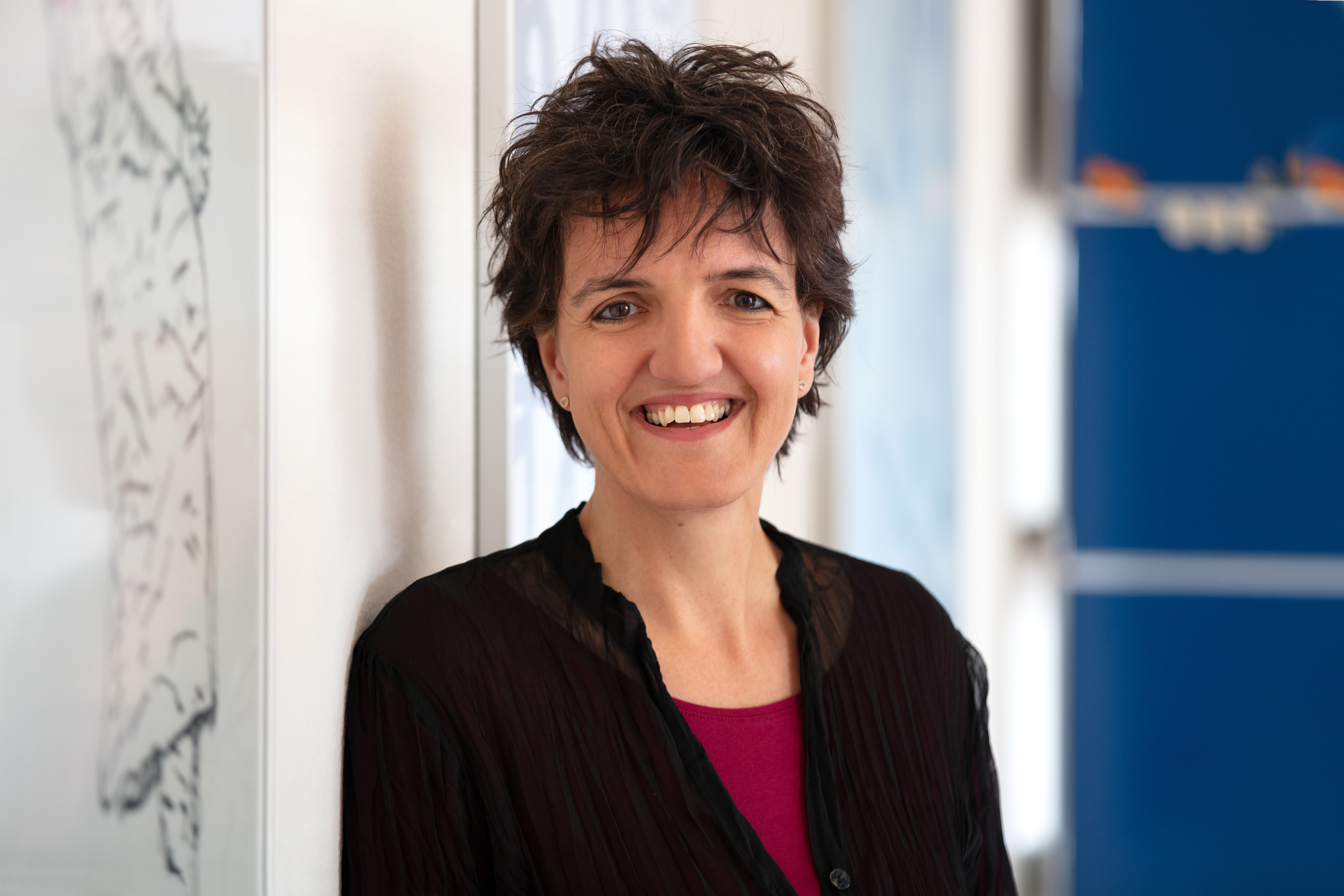
- Silvia Arber in 2019
- Born: 1968 (age 57–58); Geneva
- Education: University of Basel
- Awards: The Brain Prize (2022); Physiological Society Annual Review Prize Lecture (2019); Louis-Jeantet Prize for Medicine (2017)
- Scientific career
- Fields: Neurobiology
- Workplaces: Columbia University; Friedrich Miescher Institute; Biozentrum University of Basel
- Thesis: Activity-sensitive signaling at the neuromuscular junction (1995)
- Website: www.biozentrum.unibas.ch/research/research-groups/research-groups-a-z/overview/unit/research-group-silvia-arber

Silvia Arber (born 1968 in Geneva) is a Swiss neurobiologist. She teaches and researches at both the Biozentrum of the University of Basel and the Friedrich Miescher Institute for Biomedical Research in Basel, Switzerland.

== Education ==
Silvia Arber studied biology at the Biozentrum of the University of Basel and completed her doctorate in 1995 at the Friedrich Miescher Institute (FMI) in Basel.

== Career and research ==
Arber subsequently worked as a postdoctoral fellow at the Columbia University in New York City. In 2000, she returned to Basel as a Professor of Neurobiology and Cell Biology continuing her research work and teaching at the Biozentrum as well as at the FMI.

Arber's research investigates the mechanisms involved in the function and assembly of neuronal circuits controlling motor behavior. She has shown that premotor interneuron groups differ from each other in their functionality and distribution in the spinal cord and that this property depends on the timing of their generation during development. Silvia Arber then turned her attention to deciphering the anatomical and functional organization of the brain stem (since 2014). This provided insight into the neuronal networks that transmit instructions for various body movements from the brain to the spinal cord. This work showed that very specific neurons are connected into circuit modules that control different aspects of body movements. For example, the fine motor skills of the arm and hand are regulated by different brainstem networks than walking or posture.

She serves as a member of the Editorial Board for Cell.

=== Awards and honors ===
- 1998: Pfizer Forschungspreis
- 2003: National Latsis Prize
- 2005: elected Member of the European Molecular Biology Organization (EMBO)
- 2005: Schellenberg Prize
- 2008: Friedrich Miescher Award
- 2009: European Research Council (ERC) Advanced Investigators Grant
- 2014: Otto Naegeli Prize
- 2014: elected Member of the Academia Europaea (MAE)
- 2017: Louis-Jeantet Prize for Medicine
- 2018: W. Alden Spencer Award
- 2018: Pradel Research Award
- 2019: Physiological Society Annual Review Prize Lecture
- 2020: Elected a member of the National Academy of Sciences of the United States
- 2022: The Brain Prize

== Personal life ==
Arber is the daughter of the Swiss microbiologist and geneticist Werner Arber, who in 1978 was awarded the Nobel Prize for Physiology or Medicine.
