= Charles G. Gross =

American neuroscientist

- Born: February 29, 1936; Brooklyn, New York, U.S.
- Died: April 13, 2019 (aged 83)
- Scientific career
- Fields: Psychology, Neuroscience

Charles Gordon Gross (February 29, 1936 – April 13, 2019) was an American neuroscientist and psychologist who was a leading figure in the emerging field of cognitive neuroscience. He spent 43 years of his career at Princeton University. His experimental work focused on visual processing in the primate cerebral cortex, and he later became known for essays and books on the history of neuroscience, including Brain, Vision, Memory: Tales in the History of Neuroscience and A Hole in the Head: More Tales in the History of Neuroscience.

== Life and work ==
Charles Gordon Gross was born in Brooklyn, New York. He received his A.B. in 1957 from Harvard University and his Ph.D. from the University of Cambridge in 1961. Gross studied sensory processing and pattern recognition in the cerebral cortex of macaque monkeys and conducted pioneering research on the visual cortex of monkeys.

Gross made many important discoveries in his career, including the finding that neurons in the inferior temporal cortex (ITC) are selectively activated by complex objects and the discovery of "face cells," neurons that are specifically activated by the sight of faces.[4] He also discovered hand-selective neurons in the macaque cerebral cortex in 1969.[5] Gross's work on the ITC and face perception was groundbreaking and helped to establish the field of neuroscience.[4] He was elected to the National Academy of Sciences in 1998 and to the American Academy of Arts and Sciences in 1999.

Gross's work on the ITC and face perception was groundbreaking and helped to establish the field of neuroscience. He was recognized for his contributions with numerous awards and honors, including being named a Fellow of the American Academy of Arts and Sciences.

Gross's marriage to Gaby Gross ended in divorce. Subsequently, he was married to art historian Greta Berman from 1988 to 2000; and to writer Joyce Carol Oates from 2009 until his death in 2019.
