= Wolfram Schultz =

British-European professor of neuroscience

Wolfram Schultz FRS
- Education: University of Heidelberg (MD); University of Fribourg (PhD)
- Known for: Demonstrated dopamine neurons signal errors in reward prediction
- Awards: Lashey Award (2019); Gruber Prize (2018); The Brain Prize (2017); Golden Brain Award (2002)
- Scientific career
- Workplaces: University of Cambridge
- Website: www.wolframschultz.org

Wolfram Schultz FRS is a Professor of Neuroscience at the University of Cambridge known for his discovery of the neurophysiological dopamine reward signal.

== Life and career ==
Schultz received his medical degree from the University of Heidelberg in 1972 and his PhD (habilitation) in Physiology from the University of Fribourg, Switzerland. He completed three postdoctoral research fellowships: with the neurophysiologist Otto Creutzfeld at the Max-Planck Institute for Biophysical Chemistry in Gottingen, Germany, the neurophysiologist John C. Eccles at State University of New York at Buffalo in the USA, and the neurohistologist and neuropsychopharmacist Urban Ungerstedt at the Karolinska Institute in Stockholm. Schultz worked at the University of Fribourg from 1977 to 2001 and then moved to the University of Cambridge in 2001, where he is Professor of Neuroscience (and has been Wellcome Principal Research Fellow from 2001 to 2023).

== Research ==
During the 1980s and 1990s, Schultz was experimenting with macaque monkeys when he found that dopamine neurons in their basal ganglia increased in activity after they were given a reward. This led to the discovery for which he is best known: dopamine neurons signal errors in reward prediction (the difference between the reward an animal expects and the reward it actually receives). He subsequently carried his work to the neuroeconomics of reward and decision-making, using concepts from economic choice theory and studying dopamine neurons, orbitofrontal cortex, striatum and amygdala.

== Honours and awards ==
- 2019: Karl Spencer Lashley Award
- 2018: Gruber Prize in Neuroscience
- 2017: The Brain Prize
- 2002: Golden Brain Award

Professor Schultz has an h-index of 101.

He is a Fellow of the Royal Society, Member of the Academia Europaea and past president of the European Brain and Behaviour Society.

== Selected publications ==
- Schultz, Wolfram; Dayan, Peter; Montague, P. Read (1997). "A neural substrate of prediction and reward". Science. 275: 1593–1599. doi:10.1126/science.275.5306.1593. PMID 9054347.
- Schultz W (1998). "Predictive reward signal of dopamine neurons". J Neurophysiol. 80: 1–27. doi:10.1152/jn.1998.80.1.1. PMID 9658025.
- Schultz W (2002). "Getting formal with dopamine and reward". Neuron. 36: 241–263. doi:10.1016/s0896-6273(02)00967-4. PMID 12383780.
- Schultz W (2015). "Neuronal reward and decision signals: from theories to data". Physiol Rev. 95: 853–951. doi:10.1152/physrev.00023.2014. PMC 4491543. PMID 26109341.
