= Okihide Hikosaka =

Neuroscience Professor

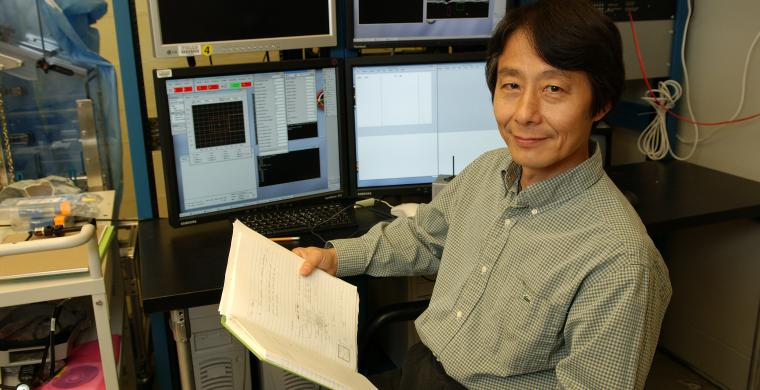
- Born: Nagano City, Japan
- Citizenship: United States
- Education: University of Tokyo
- Scientific career
- Fields: the mechanisms of motivation, learning, skill, decision-making, attention, and oculomotor control.
- Workplaces: Toho Univ School of Medicine; National Eye Institute; National Institute of Physiological Sciences in Okazaki; Juntendo Univ School of Medicine; Laboratory of Sensorimotor Research, National Eye Institute, National Institute of Health

Okihide Hikosaka is a neuroscience research professor who specializes in the mechanisms of motivation, learning, skill, decision-making, attention, and oculomotor control. His research into neuronal mechanisms of voluntary behavior and basal ganglia function created breakthroughs in the understanding of the neurochemistry behind information-seeking behavior and the efficacy of grouping motor sequence learning actions (otherwise known as “chunking”) in order to remember more than individual actions.

Hikosaka’s research proved that the brain is chemically wired to be rewarded with dopamine for learning information about the future.

“This result supports the notion that midbrain dopamine neurons are coding for both primitive and cognitive rewards. So why do dopamine neurons treat information as a reward? It’s easy to see how treating information this way might be a useful evolutionary adaptation. For many animals, each day consists of numerous decisions that pertain to eating, reproducing and socializing. Obviously, having access to more relevant information – such as knowing where the food is located - allows animals to make better decisions. Furthermore, having access to such information might give us better control over our environment, thus increasing our chances of survival.”

Hikosaka's research impacts the understanding of drug abuse, Parkinson’s and many other aspects of behavior and brain function and dysfunction.

== Awards ==
- Gruber Foundation Neuroscience Prize, 2018
- Golden Brain Award from Minerva Foundation, 2015
- Tokizane Toshihiko Memorial Award, 1999
- Tsukahara Memorial Award, 1989
