= William Newsome =

American neuroscientist

- Born: June 5, 1952 (age 74); Live Oak, Florida
- Education: Stetson University; Caltech
- Scientific career
- Workplaces: Stanford University

William Thomas Newsome (born June 5, 1952) is an American neuroscientist at Stanford University who works to "understand the neuronal processes that mediate visual perception and visually guided behavior." He is a member of the National Academy of Sciences.

According to an article in PNAS, "What sets Newsome's research apart from many other studies in this area is that the techniques he uses—primarily, stimulation of brain areas of primates with microelectrodes—have helped demonstrate cause and effect rather than merely show a correlation between behavior and activity of the brain."

== Personal life and views ==
Newsome has been open about his Christian faith and has engaged in public dialogues about reconciling science and religious belief. He has participated in interviews and podcasts discussing topics such as free will, consciousness, and the relationship between neuroscience and faith.

== Awards ==
- Howard Hughes Medical Institute Investigator (1997– Present)
- Member National Academy of Sciences (2000)
- Member, Society for Neuroscience
- Member, American Philosophical Society
- António Champalimaud Vision Award, (2010)
- Karl Spencer Lashley Award, American Philosophical Society (2010)
- Distinguished Scientific Contribution Award, American Psychological Association
- Dan David Prize, Tel Aviv University (2004)
- W. Alden Spencer Award, Columbia University (1994)
- Rank Prize in Opto-electronics, Rank Prize Funds, London
- Pepose Award in Vision Science (2015)

== Publications ==
His publications include:

- "A selective impairment of motion perception following lesions of the middle temporal visual area" The Journal of Neuroscience (1988)
- "Neuronal correlates of a perceptual decision" Nature (1989)
- "Correlated neuronal discharge rate and its implications for psychophysical performance" Nature (1994)
- "Noise, neural codes and cortical organization" Current Opinion in Biology (1994)
- "The variable discharge of cortical neurons: implications for connectivity, computation, and information coding" The Journal of Neuroscience (1998)

== Legacy & Influence ==
Newsome is widely regarded as a pioneer in systems neuroscience. His combination of rigorous experiments, causal manipulations, and computational insight has significantly advanced how neuroscientists think about perception and decision. Many labs trace conceptual and methodological lineages back to his work.

Beyond his scientific contributions, as founding director of the Wu Tsai Neurosciences Institute, he played a key role shaping Stanford’s neuroscience culture and infrastructure.

== See also ==
- Two-alternative forced choice
