= Jon Kaas =

American neuroscientist

Jon Kaas is a professor at Vanderbilt University and a member of the United States National Academy of Sciences. He has made discoveries about the organization of the mammalian brain, including the description of many areas of the cerebral cortex and their neuroplasticity.

Work from the Kaas's laboratory is notable for its emphasis on evolutionary biology. Kaas's approach is to try to understand how complex brains evolved from ancestor forms which had relatively few areas. Some of the career highlights include:

- Some of the first descriptions of topographically organized areas in the extrastriate cortex of primates, including the middle temporal area MT, or V5 (Allman and Kaas, 1971), and the dorsomedial area, or V6.
- Demonstration of changes in the topographic representation of sensory organs in the cerebral cortex after lesions of the sensory organs (Kaas et al. 1990; see also neuroplasticity).

== Other sources ==
- Allman JM, Kaas JH (1971) A representation of the visual field in the caudal third of the middle temporal gyrus of the owl monkey (Aotus trivirgatus). Brain Res 31(1):85-105.
- Allman JM, Kaas JH (1975) The dorsomedial cortical visual area: a third tier area in the occipital lobe of the owl monkey (Aotus trivirgatus). Brain Res 1
