= Minerva Foundation =

- Founded: 1983
- Founder: Helen and Elwin Marg
- Type: Corporation
- Purpose: Neuroscience
- Location: Berkeley, California, United States
- Region served: US
- Method: Research; Awards
- Website: http://www.minervaberkeley.org

The Minerva Foundation is a US-based non-profit, scientific and charitable foundation. It is headquartered in Berkeley, California. It was established in 1983 by Helen and Elwin Marg. Other than the founders, directors include Richard M. Buxbaum, Lawrence W. Stark, Semir Zeki, Tamia Marg Anderson, Lila S. Crutchfield, and Vero Bollow.

The foundation was named after Minerva, the Roman goddess of, among other things, wisdom and medicine.

== Focus ==
Minerva Foundation is a not-for-profit, charitable foundation, dedicated to promoting novel approaches to the study of the visual brain. Since its inception in 1983, the foundation has honored exceptional scientists with its Golden Brain award and brought leading research to the general public through its series of conferences and other forums on creativity, perception, and brain science.

== Minerva House ==
Minerva Foundation maintains a large Victorian building originally built for Charles C. Boudrow (c. 1830–1918), a Massachusetts-born master mariner, in downtown Berkeley near the University of California at Berkeley campus. The house was designated a City of Berkeley Landmark on 21 June 1976. It was bought by Frank Leba and Kelly Brown in 1994, who restored and renovated the entire building. They even received a BAHA Preservation Award in 2006. The Minerva foundation finally acquired it in 2008.
