= Emery N. Brown =

American anesthesiologist

- Born: 1957 (age 68–69); Ocala, Florida, United States
- Education: Harvard University
- Known for: Systems neuroscience Computational neuroscience Mechanisms of anesthesia Neural signal processing
- Awards: Gruber Neuroscience Prize; 2025 National Medal of Science
- Scientific career
- Fields: Neuroscience; Systems neuroscience Statistics; Anesthesiology; Computational neuroscience Bioengineering
- Workplaces: Harvard Medical School; Massachusetts Institute of Technology; Massachusetts General Hospital

Emery Neal Brown (born 1957) is an American statistician, computational neuroscientist, and anesthesiologist. He is the Warren M. Zapol Professor of Anesthesia at Harvard Medical School and at Massachusetts General Hospital (MGH), and a practicing anesthesiologist at MGH. At MIT he is the Edward Hood Taplin Professor of Medical Engineering and professor of computational neuroscience, the associate director of the Institute for Medical Engineering and Science, and the director of the Harvard–MIT Program in Health Sciences and Technology.

In 2015, Brown was elected a member of the National Academy of Engineering for the development of neural signal processing algorithms for understanding memory encoding and modeling of brain states of anesthesia. Brown is one of only 19 individuals who has been elected to all three branches of the National Academies of Sciences, Engineering, and Medicine, as well as the first African American and the first anesthesiologist to be elected to all three National Academies.

In 2020, he was awarded the Swartz Prize for Theoretical and Computational Neuroscience. In 2022 he was awarded the Gruber Neuroscience Prize, alongside theoretical neuroscientists Larry Abbott, Terrence Sejnowski and Haim Sompolinsky.

== Biography ==
Brown was born and grew up in Ocala, Florida, where he attended Fessenden Elementary and Middle Schools, Osceola Junior High School and North Marion High School. He graduated from Phillips Exeter Academy, in Exeter, New Hampshire in 1974 after spending the second semester of his senior year at Exeter in the School Year Abroad Program studying Spanish in Barcelona, Spain. In 1978, he received his Bachelor of Arts (magna cum laude) in applied mathematics from Harvard College. Following graduation, Brown received an International Rotary Foundation Fellowship to study mathematics at the Institut Fourier des Mathèmatiques Pures in Grenoble, France.

Upon returning from Grenoble, he entered the Harvard Medical School MD/PhD Program. He received his Master of Arts and PhD in statistics from Harvard University in the years 1984 and 1988 respectively. He received his MD (magna cum laude) in 1987 from Harvard Medical School.

Brown completed his internship in internal medicine in 1989 at the Brigham and Women's Hospital, a research fellowship in endocrinology at the Brigham and Women's Hospital in 1992 and his residency in anesthesiology at MGH in 1992. In 1992, Brown joined the staff in the Department of Anesthesia at MGH and the faculty at Harvard Medical School. In 2005 he joined the faculty at Massachusetts Institute of Technology.

Currently, Brown is the Warren M. Zapol Professor of Anesthesia at Harvard Medical School, the Edward Hood Taplin Professor of Medical Engineering at MIT's Institute for Medical Engineering and Science, and a professor of computational neuroscience at MIT. In addition to his professorial positions, Brown serves as the director of the Neuroscience Statistics Research Laboratory at the Massachusetts Institute of Technology, the co-director of the Harvard-MIT Division of Health Sciences and Technology and an associate director of MIT's Institute for Medical Engineering & Science. Brown also works as an anesthesiologist at MGH.

== Scientific career ==
Brown has published widely on topics in Computational Neuroscience and Anesthesiology. Brown is the principal investigator of the Neuroscience Statistics Research Laboratory at MGH and MIT, where he currently conducts his research.

=== Measuring time on the human biological clock ===
Brown developed statistical methods to characterize the properties of the human circadian system (biological clock) from core temperature data recorded under the constant routine and free-running and forced desynchrony protocols. Through the early part of his career, Brown collaborated with circadian researchers to apply his methods to answer fundamental research questions in circadian physiology. Brown's statistical methods were critical for: estimating accurately the period and internal time on human circadian clocks from continuous core temperature measurement; showing that bright lights could be used to shift the phase of the human circadian clock; properly timed administration of light and dark periods could be used to realign the internal clocks of shift workers with external time; and that, contrary to beliefs at the time, the period of the human biological clock, like that of other animals, was closer to 24 hours rather than 25 hours.

=== Deciphering brain signals ===
Brown later focused his statistics research on developing signal processing algorithms and statistical methods for neuronal data analysis. He developed a state-space point process (SSPP) paradigm to study how neural systems maintain dynamic representations of information. For the analysis of neural spiking activity and binary behavioral tasks represented as multivariate or univariate point processes (0-1 events that occur in continuous time), his research produced analogs of the Kalman filter, Kalman smoothing, sequential Monte Carlo algorithms, and combined state and parameter estimation algorithms commonly applied to continuous-valued time series observations.

Brown used his methods to: show that ensembles of neurons in the rodent hippocampus maintained a highly accurate representation of the animal's spatial location; track the formation of neural receptive fields on a millisecond time scale; track concurrent changes in neural activity and behavior during learning experiments; decode how groups of motor neurons represent movement information; and track burst suppression in patients under general anesthesia.

Brown applied the state-space paradigm to: analyze learning in behavioral neuroscience experiments; study the relationship between learning and changes in hippocampal function in humans; assess the efficacy of deep brain stimulation in enhancing behavior performance in humans and non-human primates; and define precisely changes in levels of consciousness under propofol-induced general anesthesia.

With Partha Mitra, Brown co-founded and co-directed the Neuroinformatics Summer Course at the Marine Biological Laboratory in Woods Hole, MA from 2002 to 2006. He co-directs with Robert Kass the biannual Statistical Analysis of Neural Data Conference at the Carnegie Mellon University Center for the Neural Basis of Cognition. He co-authored a textbook in neuroscience data analysis with Robert Kass and Uri Eden.

In 2015, he became a founding faculty member of the Aging Brain Initiative at the MIT Picower Institute, with director Li-Huei Tsai, Edward Boyden, and others. Brown has contributed to gamma stimulation studies to promote brain health in Alzheimer's disease patients.

=== Nature of general anesthesia ===
Unraveling the mystery of general anesthesia is another major question facing modern medicine. In 2004, Brown began a systems neuroscience research program to study the mechanisms of anesthetic action by forming and leading an interdisciplinary collaboration of anesthesiologists, neuroscientists, a statistician, a neurosurgeon, neurologists, bioengineers and a mathematician at MGH, MIT and Boston University. In 2007 he received an NIH Director's Pioneer Award to support this research making him, the first anesthesiologist and the first statistician to receive this award. His anesthesiology research has made fundamental theoretical and experimental contributions to understanding the neurophysiology of general anesthesia. In two seminal papers, Brown provided the first systems neuroscience analysis of how anesthetics act at specific receptors in specific neural circuits to produce commonly observed altered arousal states. This analysis provided an essential missing link between the substantial body of research on the molecular pharmacology of anesthetic action and the behavioral responses commonly seen in anesthetized patients. Brown also shows that, contrary to common dogma general anesthesia is not sleep, but rather a reversible coma.

Brown's research group has provided detailed insights into how anesthetics produce unconsciousness. The brain is not shut off under general anesthesia. Instead, anesthetics induce highly structured oscillations between key brain regions. These oscillations, which are readily visible in standard electroencephalogram (EEG) recordings, alter arousal by impairing normal communication between regions. This is analogous to what happens when an epilepsy patient loses consciousness with the appearance of the regular, hypersynchronous oscillations of a seizure. Anesthetic-induced oscillations are also akin to what happens when a hum in a phone line makes it impossible to sustain a normal conversation.

Brown has performed many studies on the properties of propofol-induced anesthesia in particular. He found that propofol-induced unconsciousness is mediated simultaneously by two different oscillatory processes. The first is strong coherent alpha oscillations (8 to 10 cycles per second) between the cortex and the thalamus (26–28) and the second is strong incoherent cortical slow-wave oscillations (<1 cycle per second). The alpha oscillations impair communication between the thalamus and cortex. The slow waves restrict to narrow time intervals the times at which cortical neurons can discharge, thus making it difficult to sustain communication within the cortex. Furthermore, each anesthetic has a different EEG signature reflecting different neural circuit mechanism-actions. These signatures change with age and the anesthetic dose. A practical implication of this finding is that the EEG can be used in real-time to monitor accurately the anesthetic state of patients. Brown's group has developed an online teaching program to train anesthesiologists on this monitoring approach.

Brown and colleagues are establishing a new paradigm for waking patients up following general anesthesia. They have shown that the anesthetic state can be rapidly reversed by administering methylphenidate (Ritalin) or activation of dopaminergic systems. This suggests a new, feasible way to actively restore cognitive function in patients after anesthesia and sedation. They have received FDA approval to undertake a clinical trial to test this idea in humans (NCT 02051452). They have also shown that burst-suppression, a state of profound brain inactivation seen in deep general anesthesia, hypothermia, coma and developmental brain disorders, can be simply explained by a unifying neural-metabolic model. Brown's group have also shown that burst suppression can be precisely controlled to maintain a therapeutic, medically induced coma. This research uses a closed-loop control system based on his SSPP paradigm.

Brown's anesthesiology research has been featured on National Public Radio, in Scientific American, the MIT Technology Review, the New York Times and in TEDMED 2014.

== National committee service ==
Brown has served on numerous national panels and advisory committees. Most recently he served on the NIH BRAIN Initiative Working Group. His current committee service includes being a member of the Burroughs-Wellcome Fund Board of Directors, the NSF Mathematical and Physical Sciences Advisory Committee, the NIH Council of Councils, the Board of Trustees of the International Anesthesia Research Society, the Scientific Advisory Committee of CURE Epilepsy and the Governing Council of the American Academy of Arts and Sciences.

== Awards and honors ==
Brown has received a number of awards throughout his career, including: the Robert Wood Johnson Minority Medical Faculty Development Fellowship, an NSF Minority Career Development Fellowship, an National Institute of Mental Health Independent Scientist Award, the Jerome Sacks Award from the National Institute of Statistical Sciences for Outstanding Cross Disciplinary Research, an NIH Director's Pioneer Award, an NIH Director's Transformative Research Award, a Guggenheim Fellowship, and the American Society of Anesthesiologists Award for Excellence in Research. Brown was named as one of America's leading doctors by Black Enterprise Magazine and was named one of Get Konnected's GK50 Boston's 50 Most Influential People of Color in Healthcare & Life Sciences In 2018, Brown received the Dickson Prize in Science for his work on the statistical analysis of neuronal data and research on anesthesia. One of Carnegie Mellon's nominators, Professor Robert E. Kass, noted that Brown is the "world's expert on statistical analysis of neuronal data" and that Brown's work on anesthesia has been "truly transformative" for the field.

Brown has presented several memorial lectures, including: the American Society of Anesthesiology's Lewis H. Wright Memorial Lecture and John W. Severinghaus Lecture in Translational Science and the Institute of Mathematical Sciences Medallion Lecture.

Brown is a fellow of the American Institute for Medical and Biological Engineering, the American Statistical Association, the IEEE, the American Association for the Advancement of Science, and the American Academy of Arts and Sciences. Brown was inducted into the Florida Inventors Hall of Fame. Brown is a member of all three branches of the National Academies, which are the National Academy of Medicine, the National Academy of Sciences and the National Academy of Engineering. He is the first African American and the first anesthesiologist elected to all three branches. In 2019, he received an honorary doctorate from USC. In 2020, he was awarded the Swartz Prize for Theoretical and Computational Neuroscience. In 2022 he was awarded the Gruber Neuroscience Prize.

In January 2025, President Biden awarded Brown the National Medal of Science.
