= Tim Vogels =

German neuroscientist

- Born: Germany
- Known for: Inhibitory Neuroplasticity, Signal Gating, Neural systems
- Awards: Henry Dale Fellow of the Royal Society, Wellcome Trust, FENS-Kavli Network of Excellence - Bernstein Award in Computational Neuroscience

Academic background
- Education: Technische Universität Berlin, Brandeis University
- Doctoral advisor: Larry Abbott, Eve Marder

Academic work
- Discipline: Theoretical neuroscience
- Institutions: Institute of Science and Technology Austria
- Main interests: Spiking neural networks, inhibitory plasticity, excitatory / inhibitory balance, signal propagation, neuronal coding

Tim P. Vogels is a professor of theoretical neuroscience and research leader at the Institute of Science and Technology Austria. He is primarily known for his scholarly contributions to the study of neuronal plasticity related to learning and memory in the brain.

== Education and early research ==
After graduating from Gymnasium Carolinum—one of the oldest high schools in Germany—in 1997, Tim Vogels studied physics at Technische Universität Berlin in the early 2000s. He endeavoured to obtain a PhD in neuroscience with the financial support of a Fulbright Program Scholarship.

Vogels completed his doctorate research in 2007 at Brandeis University under Larry Abbott and Eve Marder's supervision and proceeded to do post-doctoral work with Rafael Yuste at Columbia University. His research involved computational modeling of synaptic plasticity rules and probing the balanced dynamics of excitatory and inhibitory properties of neocortical interneurons.

After completing his first post-doctoral fellowship in 2010, he received a Marie Curie Reintegration grant for a postdoctoral stay in the laboratory of Wulfram Gerstner at the École Polytechnique Fédérale de Lausanne (EPFL). In 2013, he moved to the University of Oxford. Together with his colleagues he published highly influential research on the role of inhibitory mechanisms of neuroplasticity in shaping balanced excitation and inhibition across cortical circuits.

== Scientific career ==
After receiving the Bernstein Prize for his work in 2012, Tim Vogels joined the Department of Physiology, Anatomy and Genetics at the University of Oxford as a Sir Henry Dale Wellcome Trust and Royal Society Research Fellow, starting his own lab at the Centre of Neural Circuits and Behaviour as a research team leader. In this capacity, he expanded on previous lines of research, advancing the use of spiking neural network models, linear algebra, and matrix mathematics to understand how the brain performs efficient computations and stores memories in complex firing activity patterns.

In 2016, he was also appointed as an associate professor and senior lecturer of medicine at St Peter's College, Oxford.

In 2020, Tim Vogels took up a post in Vienna, Austria, where he was offered and accepted the position of Professor and Group Leader at the Institute of Science and Technology Austria.

== Open science initiatives ==
Vogels actively promotes open science initiatives. He is the co-founder of the IBRO-Simons Computational Neuroscience Imbizo summer school, held annually in Cape Town, South Africa. Cooperatively organized with the International Brain Research Organization (IBRO) and the Simons Foundation, its aim is to foster neuroscience in Africa, exposing students to a faculty of expert computational neuroscientists and building international networks amongst them. He also co-founded World Wide Neuro, a platform that promotes open access to neuroscience research seminars and other virtual education resources.

== Awards and fellowships ==
Professor Vogels has received numerous awards for his work in the field, including the prestigious Bernstein Award in Computational Neuroscience, in 2012, and other acknowledgements such as research fellowships and affiliations with the Royal Society, the Wellcome Trust, and a fellowship at the FENS-Kavli Network of Excellence.

== Select publications ==
- Vogels, T. P.; Sprekeler, H.; Zenke, F.; Clopath, C.; Gerstner, W. (2011-12-16). "Inhibitory Plasticity Balances Excitation and Inhibition in Sensory Pathways and Memory Networks". Science. 334 (6062): 1569–1573. doi:10.1126/science.1211095. hdl:10044/1/21441. PMID 22075724. S2CID 45134325.
- Vogels, T. P.; Abbott, L. (2009-03-22). "Gating multiple signals through detailed balance of excitation and inhibition in spiking networks". Nature Neuroscience. 12 (4): 483–491. doi:10.1038/nn.2276. PMC 2693069. PMID 19305402.
- Vogels, T. P.; Abbott, L. (2005-11-16). "Signal Propagation and Logic Gating in Networks of Integrate-and-Fire Neurons". Journal of Neuroscience. 25 (46): 10786–10795. doi:10.1523/JNEUROSCI.3508-05.2005. PMC 6725859. PMID 16291952.
