= David Sabatini =

David Sabatini may refer to:

- David D. Sabatini, Argentine-American cell biologist and professor emeritus at New York University
- David M. Sabatini (born 1968), American cell biologist; David D. Sabatini's son
