= Gerstner =

Gerstner is a German surname. Notable people with the surname include:

- Brad Gerstner (born 1971), American investor
- Eli Gerstner (born 1980), American singer/songwriter and producer
- František Josef Gerstner (1756–1832), Czech railway engineer
- Harry Gerstner (1884–19??), American woodworker and founder of H. Gerstner & Sons
- John Gerstner (1914–1996), American theologian and academic
- Lou Gerstner (1942–2025), American businessman, chairman and chief executive officer of IBM
- Sascha Gerstner (born 1977), German musician and photographer
- Siegfried Gerstner (1916–2013), German military officer and Knight's Cross recipient
- Thomas Gerstner (born 1966), German football manager and player
- Wulfram Gerstner, German/Swiss computational neuroscientist

== See also ==
- 3887 Gerstner, main-belt asteroid
