= Kempner Institute for the Study of Natural and Artificial Intelligence =

Research institute

The Kempner Institute for the Study of Natural and Artificial Intelligence is a research institute at Harvard University devoted to advancing understanding of intelligence in biological and machine systems.

== History and mission ==
The institute was publicly launched in 2022 with the aim of bridging brain science and artificial intelligence, cultivating researchers across neuroscience, cognitive science, computer science, and related fields. In addition to research, a key part of the institute's mission is training the next generation of scientists and researchers in the field of intelligence.

== Leadership ==
The institute is co-directed by computer scientist Sham Kakade and neuroscientist Bernardo Sabatini.

== Research ==
The institute focuses on understanding the basis of intelligence in natural and artificial systems. The institute's three major research focus areas are: Science of AI, Innovation in AI, and AI and the Brain.

Kempner‑affiliated researchers contribute to a broad range of topics in machine learning, neuroscience, and biomedical AI. The institute is committed to open science and publishes research and code through its Deeper Learning blog, as well as on GitHub and Huggingface. It also collaborates with external partners on large‑scale open‑science efforts. In February 2024, the Allen Institute for AI (AI2) released the OLMo 7B (Open Language Model) framework, a release partly enabled by a collaboration with the Kempner Institute, alongside partners such as AMD, Databricks, CSC (Finland), and the University of Washington.

== Researchers ==
Researchers with formal roles within the Kempner Institute include institute investigators, associate faculty, and research fellows. Institute investigators include: Kanaka Rajan, Yilun Du, SueYeon Chung, Michael Albergo, Kianté Brantley, and Qianqian Wang.

Associate faculty members include: Haim Sompolinsky, Venkatesh Murthy, Boaz Barak, Susan Murphy, Samuel Gershman, Marinka Zitnik, Demba Ba, Talia Konkle, Cengiz Pehlevan, Stephanie Gil, David Alverez-Melis, and Patrick Slade.

== Education ==
The Kempner Graduate Fellowship supports Ph.D. students at Harvard whose research aligns with the institute's mission. The institute also runs multiple programs for Harvard undergraduates interested in intelligence‑related research. Several Kempner-affiliated undergraduate student researchers have been awarded Rhodes Scholarships.

The Kempner Post‑Baccalaureate Program is a two‑year training program for recent college graduates who intend to apply to Ph.D. programs related to the study of intelligence and who seek additional research experience and technical training.

== Computing infrastructure ==
The Kempner Institute hosts a supercomputing cluster—the Kempner AI Cluster—at the Massachusetts Green High Performance Computing Center (MGHPCC). In 2024, the Kempner AI cluster ranked 85th in the world in speed (TOP500) and 32nd in energy-efficiency (Green500). In March 2026, the Kempner Institute announced an expansion of the Kempner AI Cluster that would increase the system to 1,144 GPUs and 1.79 exaFLOPS of AI performance.

== Building ==
The Kempner Institute is housed in a 20,000 square foot computational lab and office suite, located on the sixth floor of the Harvard Science and Engineering Complex (SEC) in Allston, MA.
