= Bernardo Sabatini =

Bernardo Sabatini may refer to:

- Bernardo L. Sabatini, American neuroscientist
- Bernardo Sabadini (died 1718), Italian opera composer
