= Swartz Prize =

Neuroscience prize

The Swartz Prize for Theoretical and Computational Neuroscience is an annual award supported by the Swartz Foundation and administered by the Society for Neuroscience.

== History ==
The prize was inaugurated in 2008 to "honor an individual whose activities have produced a significant cumulative contribution to theoretical models or computational methods in neuroscience or who has made a particularly noteworthy recent advance in theoretical or computational neuroscience." The winner receives a cash prize of US$25,000 and expenses to attend the Society for Neuroscience annual meeting.

== Awardees ==
- Source: Society for Neuroscience
- 2008: Wilfrid Rall
- 2009: Horace Barlow
- 2010: Larry Abbott
- 2011: Haim Sompolinsky
- 2012: John J. Hopfield
- 2013: William S. Bialek
- 2014: Tomaso Poggio
- 2015: Terry Sejnowski
- 2016: Nancy Kopell
- 2017: Xiao-Jing Wang
- 2018: Kenneth D. Miller
- 2019: John Rinzel
- 2020: Emery N. Brown
- 2021: Nicolas Brunel
- 2022: Ila R. Fiete
- 2023: Misha Tsodyks
- 2024: Eero Simoncelli
- 2025: Alexandre Pouget
- 2026: Wulfram Gerstner

== See also ==
- List of neuroscience awards
- Neuroscience
