= Read Montague =

American neuroscientist and author (born 1960)

- Born: Pendleton Read Montague, Jr. 1960 (age 65–66)
- Education: Auburn University; University of Alabama at Birmingham
- Known for: Temporal difference learning
- Parents: Pendleton Read Montague, Sr. (father); Ann Montague (mother)
- Scientific career
- Fields: Neuroscience
- Workplaces: Baylor College of Medicine; Virginia Tech; University College London; Salk Institute for Biological Studies; Rockefeller University
- Thesis: An application of fractal sets to the analysis of neuritic patterns of cultured cat retinal ganglion cells (1988)
- Doctoral advisor: Michael Friedlander
- Other academic advisors: Terry Sejnowski; Gerald Edelman
- Doctoral students: David Eagleman

Pendleton Read Montague, Jr. (born 1960) is an American neuroscientist and popular science author. He is the director of the Human Neuroimaging Lab and Computational Psychiatry Unit at the Fralin Biomedical Research Institute at VTC in Roanoke, Virginia, where he also holds the title of the inaugural Virginia Tech Carilion Vernon Mountcastle Research Professor. Montague is also a professor in the department of physics at Virginia Tech in Blacksburg, Virginia and professor of Psychiatry and Behavioral Medicine at Virginia Tech Carilion School of Medicine.

== Education ==
In 1978 Montague graduated high school from The Lovett School in Atlanta, Georgia. From 1978–1979, Montague studied electrical engineering at Georgia Tech. He then continued his undergraduate education at Auburn University, graduating in 1983 with a bachelor's degree in mathematics. In 1988, he earned a Ph.D. in biophysics from the University of Alabama at Birmingham School of Medicine. He continued his training with a fellowship in theoretical neurobiology at The Neurosciences Institute at Rockefeller University. After completion of that fellowship, he completed another fellowship in the Computational Neurobiology Lab at The Salk Institute for Biological Studies.

== Career ==
Montague is the director of the Center for Human Neuroscience Research, the Human Neuroimaging Lab, the Human Magnetometry Lab, and the Computational Psychiatry Unit at the Fralin Biomedical Research Institute in Roanoke, Virginia, where he also holds the title of the inaugural Virginia Tech Carilion Vernon Mountcastle Research Professor. Montague is also a professor in the department of physics at Virginia Tech in Blacksburg, Virginia, a professor of Psychiatry and Behavioral Medicine at Virginia Tech Carilion School of Medicine and holds an appointment as Honorary Professor at The Wellcome Trust Centre for Neuroimaging at University College London.

From 2011-2018, Montague was a Wellcome Trust Principal Research Fellow at The Wellcome Centre for Human Neuroimaging, University College London. Before moving to the Fralin Biomedical Research Institute, Montague was the Brown Foundation Professor of neuroscience at Baylor College of Medicine, founding director of the Human Neuroimaging Lab, and founding director in 2006 of the Computational Psychiatry Unit. He was also a professor in the Menninger Department of Psychiatry and Behavioral Sciences at Baylor College of Medicine.

== Research ==
Montague's work has long focused on computational neuroscience – the connection between physical mechanisms present in real neural tissue and the computational functions that these mechanisms embody. His early theoretical work focused on the hypothesis that dopaminergic systems encode a particular kind of computational process, a reward prediction error signal, similar to those used in areas of artificial intelligence like optimal control. This work, carried out in collaboration with Peter Dayan and Terry Sejnowski, focused on prediction as a guiding concept in terms of synaptic learning rules that would underlie learning, valuation, and choice. This work proposed a modification to the then dominant idea of Hebbian or correlational learning. In particular, it was shown that dopamine neurons and homologous octopaminergic neurons in bees display a reward prediction error signal exactly consonant with the temporal difference error signal familiar from models of conditioning proposed by Sutton and Barto during the 1980s.

In pursuit of testing these prediction error ideas in humans, Montague founded the Human Neuroimaging Lab at Baylor College of Medicine in Houston, Texas, and pursued functional neuroimaging experiments analogous to those used in other model species. This work tested the reward prediction error model in human subjects using simple conditioning experiments directly analogous to those used in rodents and non-human primates. His group then tested the reward prediction error idea during an abstract task of social exchange between two interacting humans and showed striatal BOLD signals that changed their timing consistent with a prediction error signal, but in the context of a social exchange. They also tested the idea of cultural brand identity and its impact on reward prediction error signals. With Brooks King-Casas and colleagues, Montague later applied the same social exchange approach in participants with Autism Borderline Personality Disorder. These and other papers helped establish the field of computational psychiatry.

Montague and colleagues have further investigated the computational nature of dopamine as well as serotonin signals by making the first measurements of sub-second dopamine, serotonin, and noradrenaline fluctuations in the striatum of conscious human subjects.

== Popular science ==
Montague has written a nonfiction work aimed at lay audiences entitled Why Choose This Book?: How We Make Decisions. The book discusses with (mostly) non-technical language the neuroscience and psychology of decision making.

Montague also gave a TED Global Talk in 2012 where he explained how functional MRI has opened a window on the neural basis of human social interaction and how such approaches may open a window on the neural basis of social disorders. He specifically spoke about how real-time imaging allows researchers to examine the complicated neural underpinnings of human interaction.

== Awards and honors ==
- Michael E. DeBakey Excellence in Research Award: 1997, 2005
- Member, Institute for Advanced Study, Princeton, New Jersey: 2005–2006
- Kavli Fellow, 2010 National Academy of Sciences, U.S. - China Frontiers of Science
- Wellcome Trust Principal Research Fellowship, 2011–2018
- Walter Gilbert Award, Auburn University, 2011
- Network Member, 2011, 2012, 2013, 2014, 2015, 2016, The MacArthur Foundation Research Network on Law and Neuroscience
- William R. and Irene D. Miller Lectureship Recipient, Cold Spring Harbor Laboratory, 201–-2012
- Dorcas Cummings Memorial Lecture, Cold Spring Harbor Laboratory, 2018.

== Writings ==
- Your Brain Is (Almost) Perfect: How We Make Decisions. New York: Plume, 2007. ISBN 978-0-452-28884-3, previously published as Why Choose This Book?: How We Make Decisions. New York: Penguin Group (USA) Inc. ISBN 0-525-94982-8
