= Terry Sejnowski =

American neuroscientist (born 1947)

- Born: Terrence Joseph Sejnowski; 13 August 1947 (age 79); Cleveland, Ohio
- Education: Case Western Reserve University (BS); Princeton University (MA, PhD)
- Known for: Computational Neuroscience; Independent Component Analysis; Boltzmann machine NETtalk
- Awards: Gruber Neuroscience Prize (2022); Brain Prize (2024)
- Scientific career
- Fields: Computational Neuroscience; Artificial Intelligence
- Workplaces: Salk Institute; Princeton University
- Thesis: A stochastic model of nonlinearly interacting neurons (1978)
- Doctoral advisor: John Hopfield
- Notable students: Peter Dayan; Zachary Mainen; P. Read Montague
- Website: salk.edu/scientist/terrence-sejnowski/

Terrence Joseph Sejnowski (US: /ˌseɪˈnɒvskɪ/; born 13 August 1947) is the Francis Crick Professor at the Salk Institute for Biological Studies where he directs the Computational Neurobiology Laboratory and is the director of the Crick-Jacobs center for theoretical and computational biology. He has performed research in neural networks and computational neuroscience.

Sejnowski is also Professor of Biological Sciences and adjunct professor in the departments of neurosciences, psychology, cognitive science, computer science and engineering at the University of California, San Diego, where he is co-director of the Institute for Neural Computation. In 2025, he was elected to the American Philosophical Society.

With Barbara Oakley, he co-created and taught Learning How To Learn: Powerful mental tools to help you master tough subjects, the world's most popular online course, available on Coursera.

== Early life and education ==
Sejnowski was born in Cleveland in 1947.

Sejnowski received a Bachelor of Science with a major in physics from the Case Western Reserve University in 1968, a Master of Arts in physics from Princeton University (advised by John Archibald Wheeler), and a Doctor of Philosophy in physics from Princeton University in 1978 (advised by John Hopfield).

While in Princeton for his M.A. in physics, he analyzed the strength of gravitational waves from all known sources at the time, and the required sensitivity needed for detection. He noticed that all gravitational wave detectors were 1000x too insensitive to detect, and, thinking that the requisite detectors would not appear until 30 years later, decided to go into a different field.

== Career and research ==
From 1978–1979 Sejnowski was a postdoctoral fellow in the Department of Biology at Princeton University with Alan Gelperin and from 1979–1981 he was a postdoctoral fellow in the Department of Neurobiology at Harvard Medical School with Stephen Kuffler. In 1982, he joined the faculty of the Department of Biophysics at the Johns Hopkins University, where he achieved the rank of Professor before moving to San Diego, California in 1988. He was an Investigator at the Howard Hughes Medical Institute from 1991 to 2018.

He has had a long-standing affiliation with the California Institute of Technology, as a Wiersma Visiting Professor of Neurobiology in 1987, as a Sherman Fairchild Distinguished Scholar in 1993 and as a part-time Visiting Professor 1995–1998. In 2004, he was named the Francis Crick Professor at the Salk Institute and the director of the Crick-Jacobs Center for Theoretical and Computational Biology.

=== Honours and awards ===
Sejnowski received a Presidential Young Investigator Award in 1984 from the National Science Foundation (NSF). He received the Wright Prize from the Harvey Mudd College for excellence in interdisciplinary research in 1996 and the Hebb Prize for his contributions to learning algorithms by the International Neural Network Society in 1999. He became a Fellow of the Institute of Electrical and Electronics Engineers in 2000 for fundamental advances in the theory and practice of neural networks and for contributions to computational neuroscience. In the same year, he also received their Neural Network Pioneer Award in 2002. In 2003, he was elected to the Johns Hopkins Society of Scholars. He is a Senior Fellow of the Design Futures Council. He was elected to the National Academy of Medicine in 2008. In 2010, he was elected a Member of the National Academy of Sciences (NAS), and elected to the National Academy of Engineering in 2011. In 2017, he was elected to the National Academy of Inventors. These achievements place him in a group of only three living people to have been elected to all four of the national academies. In 2013, he was elected to the American Academy of Arts and Sciences and was elected Fellow of the American Physical Society in 2014. He was awarded the 2015 Swartz Prize for Theoretical and Computational Neuroscience from the Society for Neuroscience. He received an honorary doctorate from the University of Zurich in 2017. In 2022, he was awarded the Gruber Neuroscience Prize. In 2024, he was awarded The Brain Prize for pioneering work in theoretical neuroscience alongside Larry Abbott and Haim Sompolinsky. That same year, he was awarded an honorary Doctor of Science from Princeton University. He was appointed a Fellow of the Royal Society as a Foreign Member in 2025.

=== Neural networks ===
His research in neural networks and computational neuroscience has been pioneering. In the early 1980s, particularly following work by John Hopfield, computer simulations of neural networks became widespread. Early applications, particularly by Sejnowski and Geoffrey Hinton, demonstrated that simple neural networks could be made to learn tasks of at least some sophistication. In 1989, Sejnowski founded Neural Computation, published by the MIT Press, the leading journal in neural networks and computational neuroscience. He is also the President of the Neural Information Processing Systems Foundation, a non-profit organization that oversees the annual NeurIPS Conference. This interdisciplinary meeting brings together researchers from many disciplines, including biology, physics, mathematics, and engineering.

He co-invented the Boltzmann machine with Geoffrey Hinton and pioneered the application of learning algorithms to difficult problems in speech (NETtalk) and vision. He and his postdoctoral fellow, Tony Bell, developed the infomax algorithm for Independent Component Analysis (ICA) which has been widely adopted in machine learning, signal processing and data mining.

=== Research ===
The long-range goal of Sejnowski's research is to understand the computational resources of brains and to build linking principles from brain to behavior using computational models. This goal is being pursued with a combination of theoretical and experimental approaches at several levels of investigation ranging from the biophysical level to the systems level. Hippocampal and cortical slice preparations are being used to explore the properties of single neurons and synapses, including the precision of spike firing and the influence of neuromodulators. Biophysical models of electrical and chemical signal processing within neurons are used as an adjunct to physiological experiments. New techniques have been developed for modeling cell signaling using Monte Carlo methods (MCell).

The central issues being addressed are how dendrites integrate synaptic signals in neurons, how networks of neurons generate dynamical patterns of activity, how sensory information is represented in the cerebral cortex, how memory representations are formed and consolidated during sleep, and how visuo-motor transformations are adaptively organized. His laboratory has developed new methods for analyzing the sources for electrical and magnetic signals recorded from the scalp and hemodynamic signals from functional neuroimaging by blind separation using ICA. The EEGLAB public software which was as of 2012 the most popular software for processing EEG data was originally developed in his laboratory.

=== Symposia ===
He has participated and spoken at the Beyond Belief symposia in 2006 and 2007. He participated in the conference Waking Up to Sleep at the Salk Institute in February 2007 (online video available).

=== Membership ===
Sejnowski was a member of the Advisory Committee to the Director of the National Institutes of Health for the Brain Research through Application of Innovative Neurotechnologies (BRAIN) Initiative, announced by President Obama on 2 April 2013. Their BRAIN 2025 report was released by NIH on 5 June 2014 and has been used to prioritize NIH BRAIN Initiative projects. He was previously part of a team of engineers and neuroscientists who developed the Brain Activity Map Project, which served as the template for the BRAIN Initiative.

=== Authorship ===
In 1992, Sejnowski co-authored The Computational Brain with Patricia Churchland and in 2002 the book Liars, Lovers, and Heroes; What the New Brain Science Reveals About How We Become Who We are with Steven R. Quartz. His book, The Deep Learning Revolution, was published by the MIT Press in June 2018. His most recent book, ChatGPT and the Future of AI: The Deep Language Revolution, was published by the MIT Press in October 2024.

He has co-created (with Professor Barbara Oakley) and teaches Learning How to Learn: Powerful mental tools to help you master tough subjects, a massive open online course offered on Coursera. The course had its first three runs in August and October 2014 and January 2015, when it attracted approximately 300,000 students. In 2015, enrollment in the course reached 1 million, a total of about 2 million students as of August 2017, 3 million students as of 2021, and 4 million students as of 2024.
