= Simon Stringer =

British neuroscientist

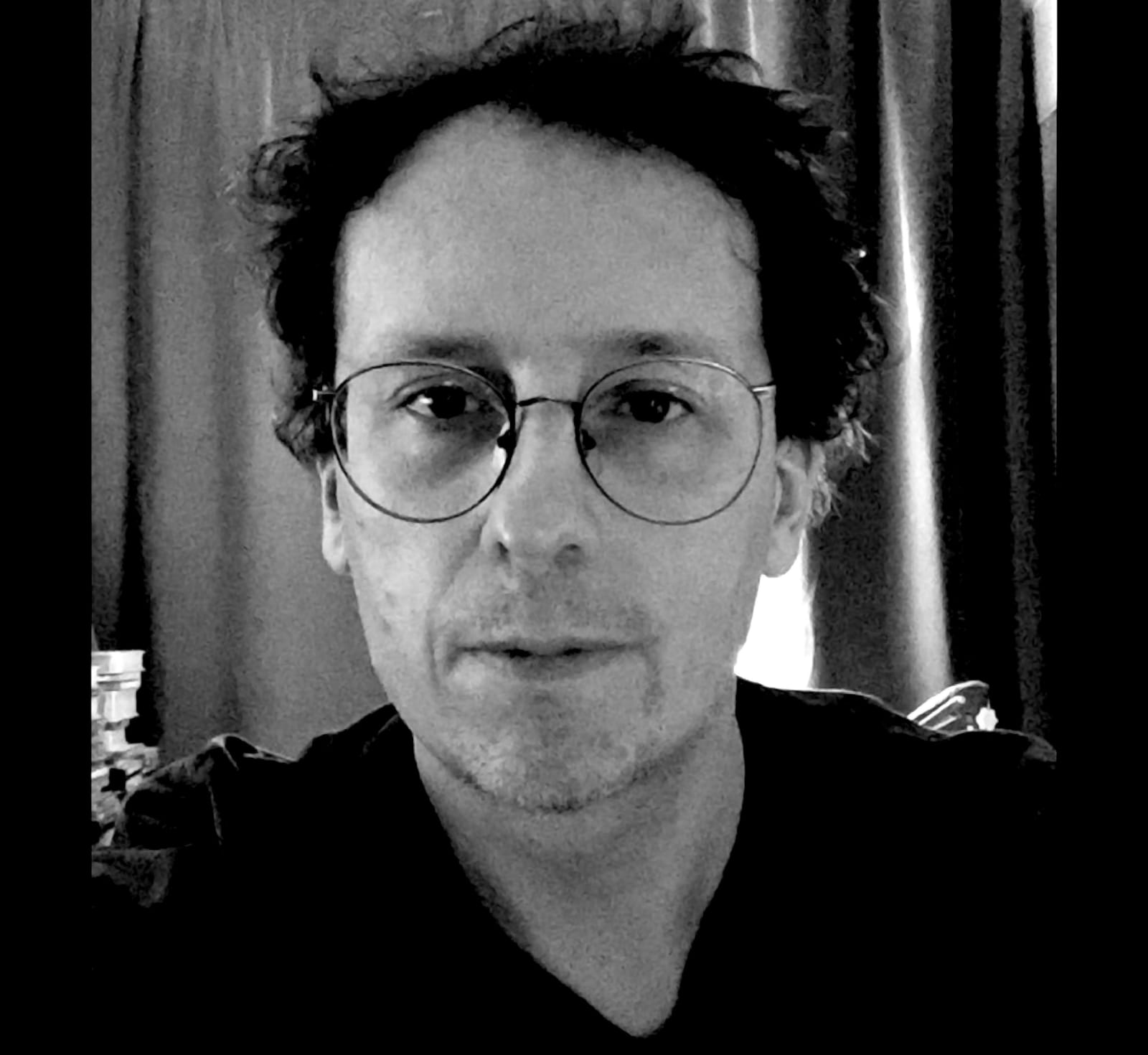
- Education: BSc University of Kent; PhD University of Reading
- Scientific career
- Fields: Theoretical Neuroscience; Computational Neuroscience; Artificial Intelligence
- Workplaces: University of Oxford
- Doctoral advisor: Nancy K. Nichols
- Website: www.oftnai.org

Simon Stringer is a departmental lecturer, Director of the Oxford Centre for Theoretical Neuroscience and Artificial Intelligence, and Editor-in-Chief of Network: Computation in Neural Systems published by Taylor & Francis.

== Research ==
Stringer and his research group develop biological computer simulations of the neuronal mechanisms underpinning various areas of brain function, including visual object recognition, spatial processing and navigation, motor function, language and consciousness.

In particular, the study published in Psychological Review and Interface Focus 2018, the Royal Society's cross-disciplinary journal, proposes a novel approach to solve the Binding problem. Spiking neural network simulations of the primate ventral visual system have shown the gradual emergence of a subpopulation of neurons, called polychronous neuronal groups (PNGs), that exhibits regularly repeating spatiotemporal patterns of spikes. The underlying phenomenon of these characteristic patterns of neural activity is known as polychronization.

The main point is that within these PNGs exist neurons, called binding neurons. Binding neurons learn to represent the hierarchical binding relationships between lower and higher level visual features in the hierarchy of visual primitives, at every spatial scale and across the entire visual field. This observation is consistent with the hierarchical nature of primate vision proposed by the two neuroscientists John Duncan and Glyn W. Humphreys almost thirty years ago.

Furthermore, this proposed mechanism for solving the binding problem suggests that information about visual features at every spatial scale, including the binding relations between these features, would be projected upwards to the higher layers of the network, where spatial information would be available for readout by later brain systems to guide behavior. This mechanism has been called the holographic principle.

These feature binding representations are at the core of the capacity of the visual brain to perceive and make sense of its visuospatial world and of the consciousness itself. This finding represents an advancement towards the future development of artificial general intelligence and machine consciousness. According to Stringer:

Today's machines are unable to perceive and comprehend their working environment in the same rich semantic way as the human brain. By incorporating these biological details into our models[...] will allow computers to begin to make sense of their visuospatial world in the same way as the [human] brain.
