= Sham Kakade =

American computer scientist

Sham Machandranath Kakade
- Education: Caltech; University College London
- Scientific career
- Fields: Computer Science, Artificial Intelligence
- Workplaces: Toyota Technological Institute at Chicago; Wharton; Microsoft Research; University of Washington; Harvard University
- Doctoral advisor: Peter Dayan

Sham Machandranath Kakade is an American computer scientist. He is a Gordon McKay Professor in Computer Science at Harvard University, with a joint appointment in the Department of Statistics. Kakade is a co-director of the Kempner Institute for the Study of Natural and Artificial Intelligence. He co-founded the Algorithmic Foundations of Data Science Institute.

== Education and Career ==
Kakade earned a Bachelor of Science in Physics from the California Institute of Technology and a PhD from the Gatsby Computational Neuroscience Unit at University College London, under the supervision of Peter Dayan. Prior to his current position at Harvard, he served as a Principal Researcher at Microsoft Research, an assistant professor at the Toyota Technological Institute at Chicago and Wharton, and a professor at the University of Washington.

== Research ==
Kakade's research includes work on Reinforcement Learning, Tensor-Algebraic methods, and Convex optimization.

=== Reinforcement Learning ===
Kakade's doctoral work helped established statistical frameworks used in the study of sample complexity in reinforcement learning. He co-developed methods in policy optimization, including early work on natural policy gradient, conservative policy iteration. Kakade has contributed to theoretical analyses of reinforcement learning algorithms with provable performance guarantees.

=== Bandit Models ===
Kakade has worked extensively on multi-armed and structured bandit models, including linear and Gaussian process-based bandit. He co-authored "Gaussian Process Optimization in the Bandit Setting: No Regret and Experimental Design," which studied Gaussian process methods in a nonparametric bandit setting. The work established regret bounds connected to information gain in Gaussian process models.

=== Optimization ===
Kakade has studied convex optimization and non-covex optimization in machine learning. His work includes the analysis of optimization algorithms for escaping saddle points in non-convex problems. He has also co-authored research on optimization methods used in modern machine learning system.

== Awards ==
Kakade was a co-recipient of the Test of Time Award at the International Conference on Machine Learning (ICML) in 2020 for the paper "Gaussian Process Optimization in the Bandit Setting: No Regret and Experimental Design." The ICML awards committee cited the paper's influential role in connecting Gaussian process models, bandit optimization, and experimental design.

He was a recipient of the INFORMS Revenue Management and Pricing section Prize in 2014. Kakade has served on the Alfred P. Sloan Foundation's selection committee for the Computer Science Sloan Research Fellowships.
