= Larry Abbott =

American theoretical neuroscientist (born 1950)

Larry F. Abbott
- Born: 1950 (age 75–76)
- Education: Oberlin College; Brandeis University
- Known for: Dynamic clamp method
- Awards: Irving Institute MOTY Award; IBT Math. Neuro. Prize; NIH Pioneer Award; Swartz Prize; Brain prize 2024
- Scientific career
- Fields: Theoretical Neuroscience
- Institutions: Columbia University
- Thesis: The Hartree approximation in quantum field theory (1977)
- Doctoral advisor: Howard Schnitzer
- Doctoral students: Kanaka Rajan, Tim Vogels

Laurence Frederick Abbott (born 1950) is an American theoretical neuroscientist, who is currently the William Bloor Professor of Theoretical Neuroscience at Columbia University, where he helped create the Center for Theoretical Neuroscience. He is widely regarded as one of the leaders of theoretical neuroscience, and is coauthor, along with Peter Dayan, on the first comprehensive textbook on theoretical neuroscience, which is considered to be the standard text for students and researchers entering theoretical neuroscience. He helped invent the dynamic clamp method alongside Eve Marder.

Abbott has received numerous awards for his work in the field, including memberships in the National Academy of Sciences and the American Academy of Arts and Sciences. In 2010, he received the Swartz Prize for Theoretical and Computational Neuroscience. In 2022 he was awarded the Gruber Neuroscience Prize. In 2024, he was awarded The Brain Prize for contributions to theoretical neuroscience, alongside Terrence Sejnowski and Haim Sompolinsky.

== Biography ==
Abbott attended Oberlin College from 1968 to 1971, where he received a bachelor's degree in physics. He subsequently attended graduate school at Brandeis University from 1973 to 1977, where he received his Ph.D. in physics.

== Scientific career ==
He subsequently worked in theoretical particle physics, serving as research associate at Stanford Linear Accelerator Center from 1977 to 1979, as a Scientific Associate at the Theory division at CERN from 1980 to 1981, and as a tenure track professor in the physics department at Brandeis from 1979 to 2005. Abbott began his transition to neuroscience research in 1989, joined the Department of Biology at Brandeis in 1993, and was the co-director of Brandeis Sloan Center for Theoretical Neurobiology from 1994 to 2002, the director of the Volen National Center for Complex Systems at Brandeis from 1997 to 2002, and a visiting faculty at UCSF Sloan Center for Theoretical Neuroscience from 1994 to 2002. At Brandeis, he held the position of the Nancy Lurie Marks Professor of Neuroscience from 1997 to 2002 and the Zalman Abraham Kekst Professor of Neuroscience from 2003 to 2005. In 2005, he joined the faculty of Columbia University, where he is currently a member of the Department of Neuroscience, and the Department of Physiology and Cellular Biophysics. He is co-director of the Center for Theoretical Neuroscience. He has been a senior fellow at HHMI Janelia Farm Research Campus since 2015.

== Select publications ==
- Abbott, L. F.; Varela, J. A.; Sen, Kamal; Nelson, S. B. (10 January 1997). "Synaptic Depression and Cortical Gain Control". Science. 275 (5297): 221–224. doi:10.1126/science.275.5297.221. ISSN 0036-8075. PMID 8985017.
- Song, Sen; Miller, Kenneth D.; Abbott, L. F. (September 2000). "Competitive Hebbian learning through spike-timing-dependent synaptic plasticity". Nature Neuroscience. 3 (9): 919–926. doi:10.1038/78829. ISSN 1546-1726. PMID 10966623.
- Sussillo, David; Abbott, L.F. (August 2009). "Generating Coherent Patterns of Activity from Chaotic Neural Networks". Neuron. 63 (4): 544–557. doi:10.1016/j.neuron.2009.07.018. PMC 2756108. PMID 19709635.
- Rajan, Kanaka; Abbott, L. F.; Sompolinsky, Haim (7 July 2010). "Stimulus-dependent suppression of chaos in recurrent neural networks". Physical Review E. 82 (1) 011903. arXiv:0912.3513. Bibcode:2010PhRvE..82a1903R. doi:10.1103/PhysRevE.82.011903. PMC 10683875. PMID 20866644. S2CID 946870.
- Vogels, T. P.; Abbott, L. (2009-03-22). "Gating multiple signals through detailed balance of excitation and inhibition in spiking networks". Nature Neuroscience. 12 (4): 483–491. doi:10.1038/nn.2276. PMC 2693069. PMID 19305402.
- Rajan, Kanaka; Abbott, L. F. (2 November 2006). "Eigenvalue Spectra of Random Matrices for Neural Networks" (PDF). Physical Review Letters. 97 (18) 188104. Bibcode:2006PhRvL..97r8104R. doi:10.1103/PhysRevLett.97.188104. PMID 17155583.

== Awards, honors, and memberships ==
- The Brain Prize 2024
- Gruber Neuroscience Prize 2022
- National Institutes of Health Director's Pioneer Award
- Swartz Prize
- Israel Brain Technologies' Mathematical Neuroscience Prize.
- First Annual Prize in Mathematical Neuroscience.
- Irving Institute Mentor of the Year Award.
- National Academy of Sciences member
- Member, Kavli Institute for Brain Science
- Member of the Motor Neuron Center, Columbia University
- Senior Fellow, HHMI Janelia Farm Research Campus
- American Academy of Arts and Sciences
- Fellow, American Association for the Advancement of Science
- Steering Committee, Safra Center for Brain Sciences, Hebrew University
- Scientific Advisory Panel, Gatsby Unit, UCL
- Advisory Council for Physics Department, Princeton University
- Scholars Selection Committee, McKnight Foundation
- Mindscope Advisory Council, Allen Institute for Brain Science
- Scientific Advisory Board, Champalimaud Neuroscience Program
- Brain and Cognitive Sciences Visiting Committee, MIT
- Scientific and Academic Advisory Committee, Weizmann Institute
- Executive Committee, Simons Collaboration on the Global Brain

== Published works ==
- Prinz, Astrid A.; Abbott, L.F.; Marder, Eve (April 2004). "The dynamic clamp comes of age" (PDF). Trends in Neurosciences. 27 (4). Elsevier: 218–224. doi:10.1016/j.tins.2004.02.004. PMID 15046881. S2CID 11246529. Archived from the original (PDF) on May 8, 2014.
