= Network: Computation in Neural Systems =

- Discipline: Computational neuroscience
- Language: English
- Edited by: Simon Stringer

Publication details
- History: 1990-present
- Publisher: Informa
- Frequency: 4 issues per year
- Impact factor: 7.8 (2022)

Standard abbreviations
- ISO 4: Netw. Comput. Neural Syst.

Indexing
- CODEN: NEWKEB
- ISSN: 0954-898X (print); 1361-6536 (web)
- LCCN: 92641787
- OCLC no.: 21370403

Links
- Journal homepage

Network: Computation in Neural Systems is a scientific journal that aims to provide a forum for integrating theoretical and experimental findings in computational neuroscience with a particular focus on neural networks. The journal is published by Taylor & Francis and edited by Dr Simon Stringer (University of Oxford).

Network: Computation In Neural Systems was established in 1990. It is published 4 times a year.

Citation metrics:

- 7.8 (2022) Impact Factor
- Q1 Impact Factor Best Quartile
- 2.9 (2022) 5 year IF
- 2.7 (2022) CiteScore (Scopus)
- 0.836 (2022) SNIP
- 0.255 (2022) SJR
