= David D. Sabatini =

Argentinian-American cell biologist

- Born: David Domingo Sabatini
- Education: National University of the Litoral (MD, 1954); Rockefeller University (PhD, 1966)
- Children: Bernardo L. Sabatini; David M. Sabatini
- Awards: E.B. Wilson Medal (1986)
- Scientific career
- Fields: Cell biology
- Workplaces: Rockefeller University, New York University
- Notable students: Enrique Rodriguez-Boulan

David Domingo Sabatini is an Argentine-American cell biologist and the Frederick L. Ehrman Professor Emeritus of Cell Biology in the Department of Cell Biology at New York University School of Medicine, which he chaired from 1972 to 2011. Sabatini's major research interests have been on the mechanisms responsible for the structural complexity of the eukaryotic cell. Throughout his career, Sabatini has been recognized for his efforts in promoting science in Latin America.

== Early life and education ==
Sabatini is a native of Argentina, and attended medical school in Rosario at the National University of the Litoral. He began his research career at the University of Buenos Aires, in the laboratory of Eduardo de Robertis, a founder of modern cell biology, where he developed skills in electron microscopy. In 1961, as a Rockefeller Foundation fellow, he traveled to the United States, first for a six-month stint at Yale University to work with histochemist Russell Barnett, and then to work with George Palade and Philip Siekevitz at the Rockefeller University. Whilst at Yale he introduced glutaraldehyde as a fixative for electron microscopy and cytochemistry. After a year as a postdoctoral fellow at Rockefeller, Sabatini entered the Rockefeller graduate program from which he received a PhD in 1966 for studies on protein translation by ribosomes attached to endoplasmic reticulum membranes.

== Research overview ==
Sabatini's research has focused on the mechanisms by which proteins are targeted to different organelles within the cell. His early work studied co-translational targeting of ribosomes to the endoplasmic reticulum and helped establish the hypothesis that signal peptides direct protein traffic to cellular compartments. He later focused on trafficking from the Golgi apparatus to secretory vesicles and to the plasma membrane and in particular the mechanisms that address membrane proteins to the different surface domains of epithelial cells for which he employed viral infected epithelial monolayers.

== Academic career ==
After finishing his PhD, Sabatini joined the faculty at Rockefeller and in his own laboratory continued studies on protein trafficking in the ER. With a group of young associates (Nica Borgese, Mark Adelman, and Gert Kreibich), collaborating with Gunter Blobel, he continued research on the mechanism that ensures the co-translational translocation and vectorial discharge of nascent polypeptides into and across the endoplasmic reticulum membrane. In in vitro experiments they discovered that the microsomal membrane protected the N-terminal portion of nascent polypeptides synthesized in membrane bound ribosomes from proteolytic attack by exogenous enzymes. These studies strongly implicated the N-terminal portions of nascent polypeptides in establishing and maintaining the association of bound ribosomes with ER membranes.

Largely based on these findings, in 1971 Blobel and Sabatini proposed a speculative model that later came to be known as the "signal hypothesis". For a discussion of the genesis and evolution of the signal hypothesis see LaBonte, 2017 In the 1971 paper, Blobel and Sabatini proposed that “all mRNAs to be translated on bound ribosomes have a common feature, such as several codons near their 5’ end, not present in mRNAs which are to be translated on free ribosomes” and that “the resulting common sequence of amino acids near the N-termini of the nascent chains, or a modification of it, would then be recognized by a factor mediating the binding to the membrane." They proposed that "This binding factor could be a soluble protein, which recognizes both a site on the large ribosomal subunit and a site on the membrane.” A decade later, Walter and Blobel demonstrated the existence of a Signal Recognition Protein (SRP) that mediates the binding of the ribosome and the signal sequence within the nascent chain to the membrane. In 1982, a cognate receptor for the Signal Recognition Particle (SRP) was discovered and characterized in the ER membrane.

In 1972, Sabatini moved his laboratory to the New York University School of Medicine to become the chair of the Department of Cell Biology, where he assembled a group that focused on the study of membrane and organelle biogenesis. Initially, that work placed a primary emphasis on identifying structural features of secretory, lysosomal and integral membrane proteins that are synthesized on membrane bound ribosomes, address them to specific subcellular locations and determine their disposition within a membrane.

In the late 1970s, in collaboration with Marcelino Cereijido he introduced the now widely used MDCK cell culture system for the study of epithelial cell polarity and together with Enrique Rodriguez-Boulan reported the landmark discovery of the asymmetric budding of specific enveloped viruses from the different surfaces of epithelial cells.

== Honors and awards ==
Sabatini was elected a fellow of the American Academy of Arts and Sciences in 1980 and became a member of the U.S. National Academy of Sciences in 1985. In 1986, together with Günter Blobel, he received the E.B. Wilson Medal, the highest honor of the American Society of Cell Biology, of which he was president in 1978-79. He was selected to give the ASCB's Keith R. Porter Lecture in 1983.

He is a member of the U.S. National Academy of Medicine, a member of the American Philosophical Society, and a foreign associate of the French Academy of Sciences. He was awarded the Charles Leopold Mayer Prize (1986) and the Grande Médaille (2003) by the French Academy of Sciences, and in 2006 he was named a Chevalier de la Légion d’honneur.

== Personal life ==
Sabatini's wife Zulema is also from Argentina and is a medical doctor specializing in pathology. The couple's two sons are both current or former MD–PhD academic research scientists and Howard Hughes Medical Institute investigators: Bernardo L. Sabatini is a neuroscientist at Harvard Medical School and David M. Sabatini is a cell biologist, first at the Massachusetts Institute of Technology until he resigned in 2022, and now at Institute of Organic Chemistry and Biochemistry.
