= Constant routine protocol =

A constant routine protocol is a common method used in human circadian rhythm research to study internally generated, or endogenous, circadian rhythms without the effect of external, or exogenous, influences. In the method, subjects are kept in constant conditions for at least 24 hours. These include constant light and temperature, as well as constant semi-recumbent posture. In addition, subjects' food intake is evenly distributed throughout the protocol, and subjects are typically not allowed to sleep for the duration. While in these conditions, subjects are often assessed for a number of variables of interest. Two of the most common and best understood of these variables are core body temperature and melatonin.

== History ==
The term was first coined by in 1978 after it was used in an experiment to determine the effects of jet lag independent of an individual's behavioral cycle - though the methods involved in a constant routine date back to at least 1947.

The protocol arose from the well established concept in circadian research that the observation of organisms under constant conditions allows for the illumination of endogenous rhythms, as first described by French scientist Jean-Jacques d'Ortous de Mairan in 1729. In contrast to previous methods, however, the constant routine protocol was developed upon the recognition that several key behaviors exhibiting circadian rhythmicity (including sleep-wake cycle, the behavioral cycle, and the food-intake cycle) also act as masking agents of some endogenous rhythms.

== Discoveries ==
The constant routine protocol, because of its ability to drastically reduce the masking effect of exogenous influences on the circadian pacemaker, has yielded invaluable results in the literature over the last 40 years of its use. Some of these achievements include accurate characterization of the endogenous components of the diurnal rhythms of melatonin, core body temperature, thyroid stimulating hormone (TSH), glucose tolerance, heart rate, and cognitive performance, among others.

== Drawbacks ==
Constant routine protocols have been criticized due to evidence that the conditions necessary for the protocol themselves influence the circadian clock. Sleep deprivation and constant dim lighting may mask the endogenous clock or affect circadian phase. For example, it has been demonstrated previously that sleep deprivation itself has an effect on heart rate rhythms as measured by EEG. In addition, it has been suggested that sleep deprivation and the constant routine protocol may themselves effect the circadian phase of the participant, based on research done in hamsters.
