= H. Gerstner & Sons =

American wooden tool chest manufacturer

H. Gerstner & Sons, Inc.
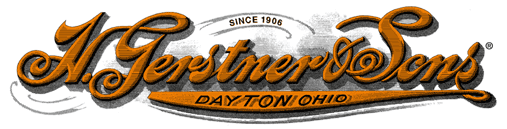
- Industry: Manufacturing
- Founded: Dayton, Ohio (1906)
- Founder: Harry Gerstner
- Headquarters: Dayton, Ohio, United States
- Key people: John Campbell; (Owner)
- Products: Tool chests
- Website: www.gerstnerusa.com

H. Gerstner & Sons, Inc. is a manufacturer of wooden tool chests based in Dayton, Ohio. Started in 1906, it has remained family-owned. Of more than twenty manufacturers building wooden tool chests for journeymen in the early 20th century, H. Gerstner & Sons is the only one to still exist.

== History ==
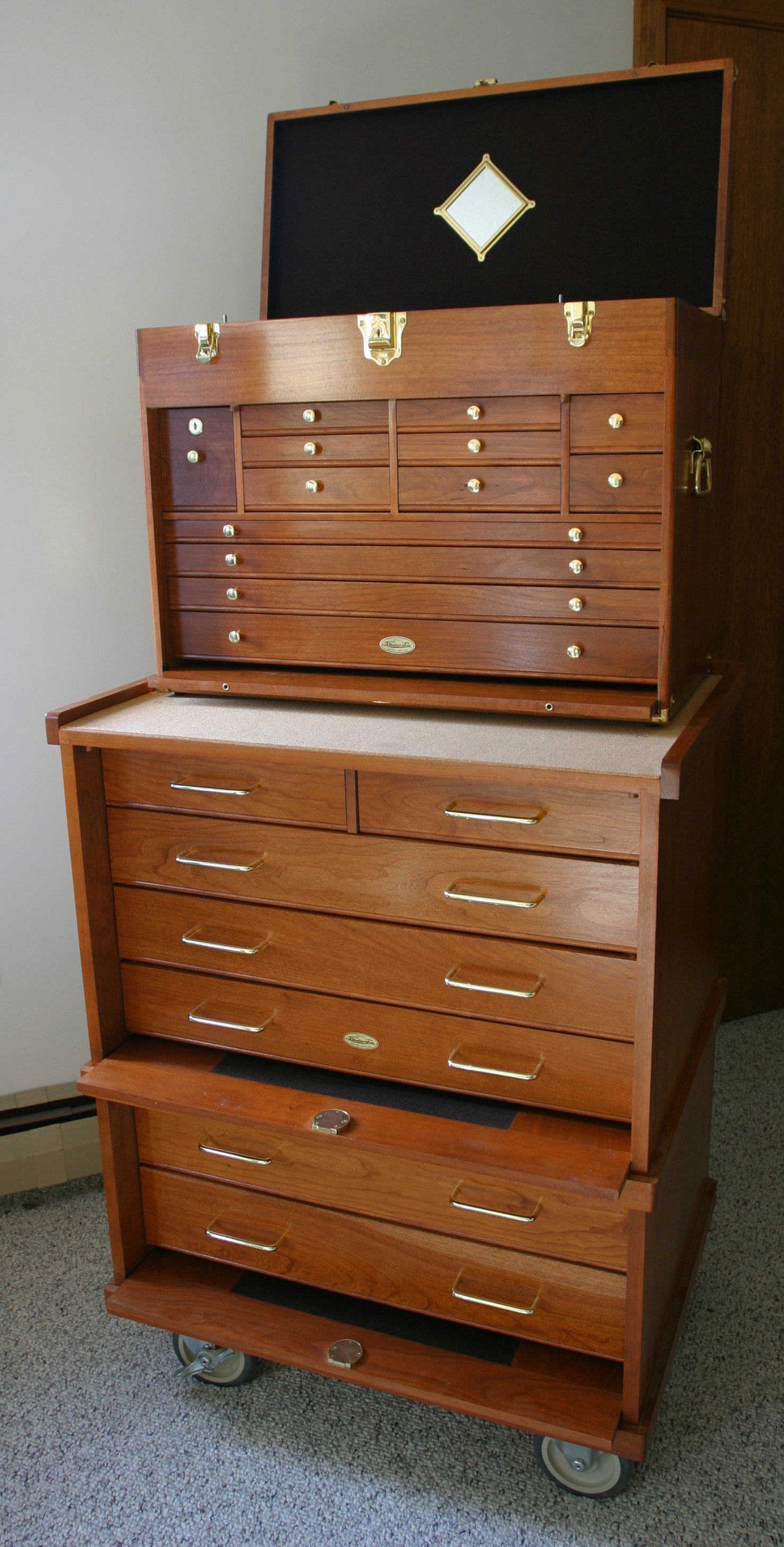
Gerstner 92XL Ultimate Chest and RB90 Roller Bench, both in cherry (2014)

The company was started in 1906 by journeyman woodworker Harry Gerstner, using a one hundred dollar bonus he had earned upon the earlier completion of his apprenticeship. The name "H. Gerstner & Sons" was chosen because it sounded well-established, but Harry Gerstner would never have any sons, instead raising three daughters with his wife, Emma. The original building occupied by the company was damaged in the Great Dayton Flood of 1913. Later that year, a new factory was built, where production has remained since.

== Products ==
H. Gerstner & Sons produces primarily tool chests, but their products also include shooter's chests, fly tying chests, jewelry boxes, and humidors. Additionally, the company will custom-build chests to a customer's specifications. As of 2001, approximately 4000 chests left the factory each year. For a short period of time in their early years, Gerstner & Sons also ventured into the boat manufacturing business.

The chests were originally made of oak, although they were ultimately also offered in cherry, walnut, and maple. While a single batch of chests (numbering as many as fifty) is being built, the drawers are selected and grouped together based on the style of their grain. Each drawer is then designated for a particular slot in a chest. The chests are assembled, sanded, and finished all in the same building, and most models also receive felt drawer lining. The tall, narrow center drawer on the popular Model 52 is sized to hold a copy of Machinery's Handbook, and the mirror inside the top lid was reportedly included to aid machinists in removing metal filings from their eyes.

== Gallery ==
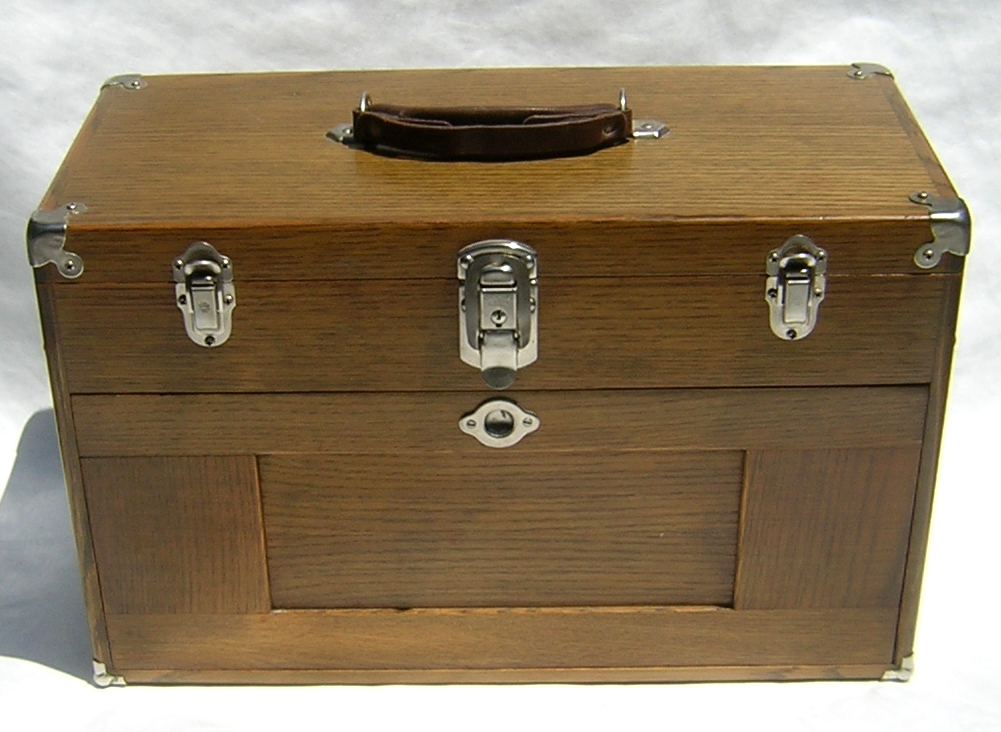
Model O-41-C

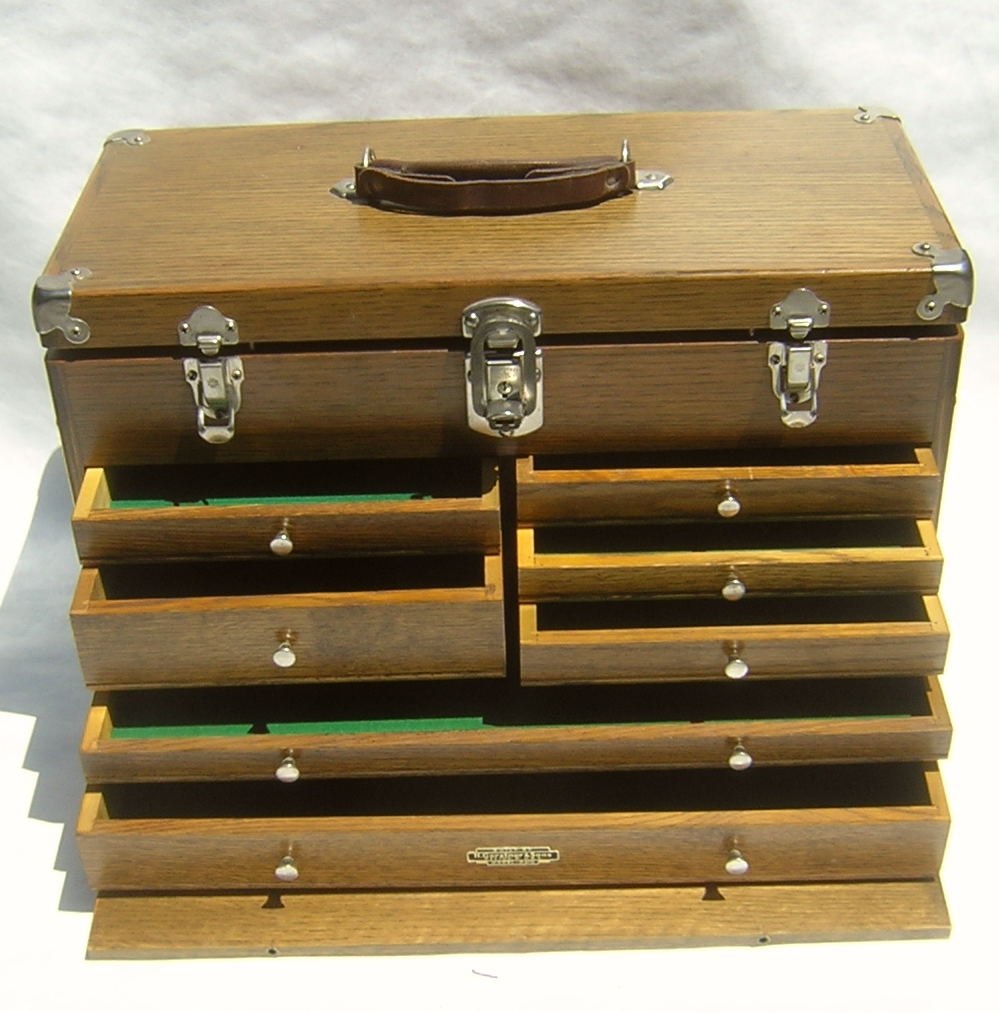
Model O-41-C

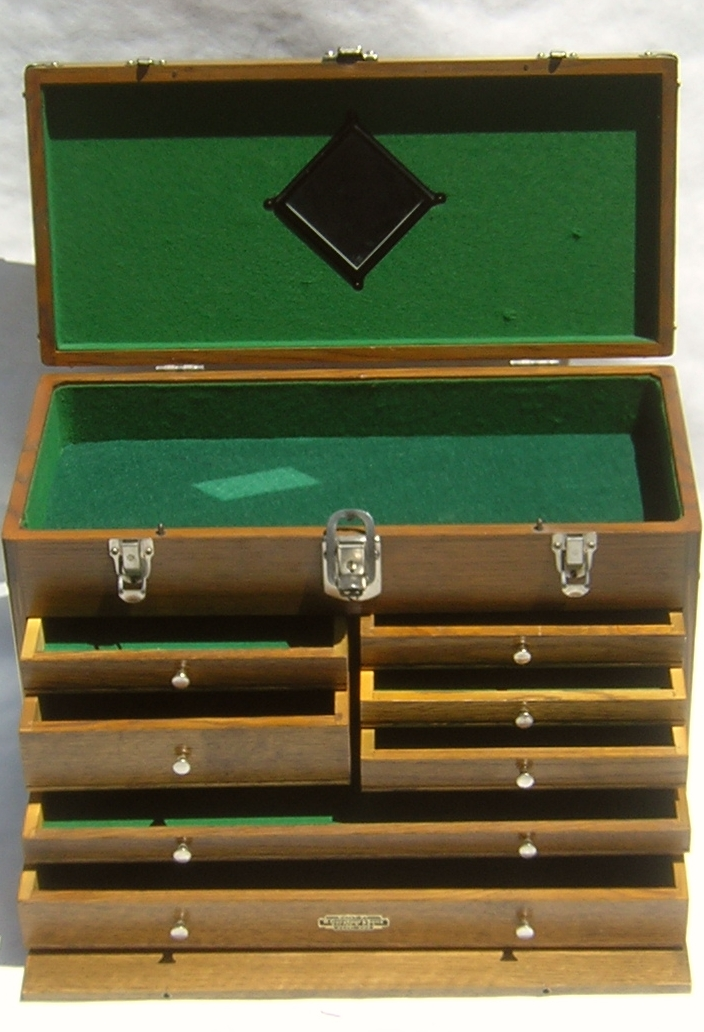
Model O-41-C

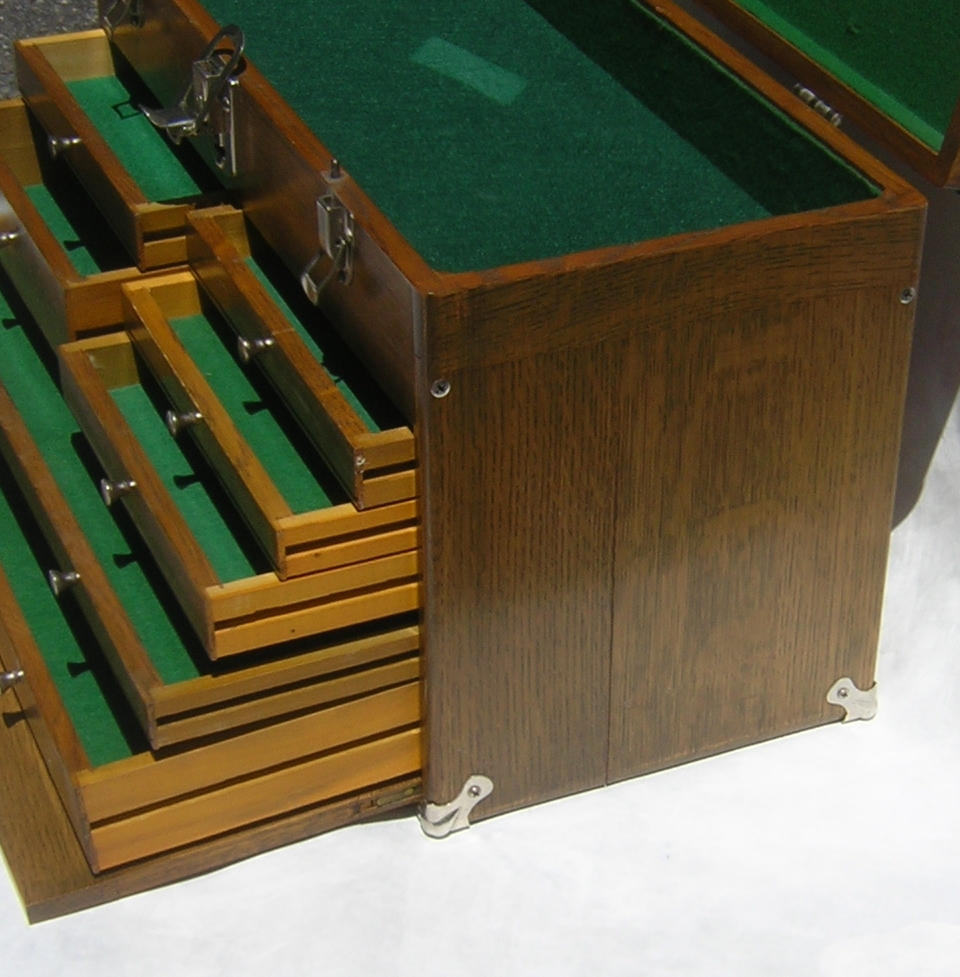
Model O-41-C

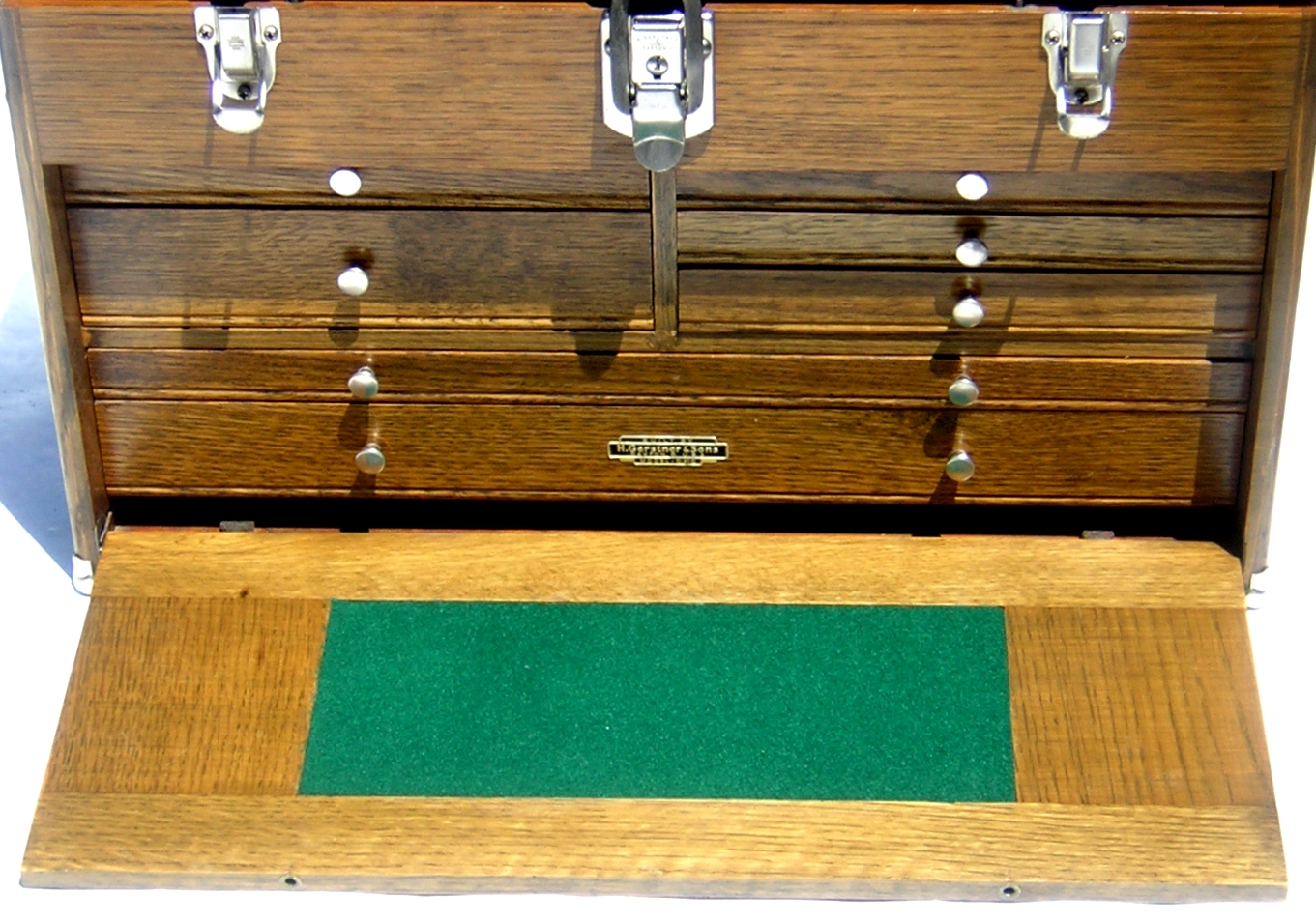
Model O-41-C
