= Bernardo L. Sabatini =

American neuroscientist

- Born: Bernardo Luis Sabatini; New York City, U.S.
- Education: Harvard University (SB, MD, PhD)
- Father: David D. Sabatini
- Relatives: David M. Sabatini (brother)
- Scientific career
- Fields: Neuroscience
- Workplaces: Harvard Medical School
- Thesis: Calcium control of neurotransmitter release at a cerebellar synapse (1997)
- Doctoral advisor: Wade Regehr

Bernardo Luis Sabatini is an American neuroscientist who is the Alice and Rodman W. Moorhead III Professor of Neurobiology at Harvard Medical School. He is an Investigator of the Howard Hughes Medical Institute (HHMI) and a co-director of the Kempner Institute for the Study of Natural and Artificial Intelligence.

== Education and academic career ==
Sabatini was born in New York City. He received his S.B. in biomedical engineering from Harvard College. He later completed the MD/PhD at Harvard Medical School, obtaining his MD through the Health Science and Technology program co-administered by Harvard and the Massachusetts Institute of Technology and his PhD through the Program in Neurobiology at Harvard. After graduation he began as a postdoctoral fellow with Karel Svoboda, then at Cold Spring Harbor Laboratory.

In 2001, Sabatini established his own research group in the Department of Neurobiology at Harvard Medical School. He was named a Howard Hughes Medical Institute Investigator in 2008. He was elected to the American Academy of Arts and Sciences in 2014 and the National Academy of Sciences in 2019.

== Research ==
Sabatini's research group studies the biophysics of synapses and synaptic plasticity, and the connection between properties of neurons and their networks to animal behavior and disease. The group has developed methods and technologies to support this work and is well known in particular for advances in two-photon microscopy and more recently, super-resolution microscopy. He is one of six co-founders of the Italy-based biotechnology company OptogeniX, which sells equipment for optogenetics studies.

=== Synapses and dendritic signaling ===
Sabatini's work has contributed to understanding the biochemical and electrical properties of dendritic spines, specialized structures that compartmentalize synaptic signaling. His studies demonstrated mechanisms regulating calcium signaling and molecular diffusion within dendritic spines. These findings helped clarify how individual synapses integrate signals during synaptic plasticity.

=== Basal ganglia circuits ===
Research in Sabatini's Lab has examined neural circuits of the basal ganglia and their role in learning and decision-making. These studies have explored how synaptic signaling and neuronal network activity contribute to behavior and motor control.

=== Optical methods and neurotechnology ===
Sabatini's group has also developed optical approaches for studying neural circuits, including application of two-photon microscopy to measure synaptic activity. He has co-authored work describing optical fiber-based systems for controlling illumination in optogenetic experiments.

== Selected publications ==
- Reinhold, K.; Iadarola, M.; Tang, S.; Chang, A.; Kuwamoto, W.; Albanese, M. A.; Sun, S.; Hakim, R.; Zimmer, J.; Wang, W.; Sabatini, B. L. (2025). "Striatum supports fast learning but not memory recall." Nature. 643 (8071): 458–467. doi:10.1038/s41586-025-08969-1. PMID 40335692.
- Hochbaum, D. R.; Hulshof, L.; Urke, A.; Wang, W.; Dubinsky, A. C.; Farnsworth, H. C.; Hakim, R.; Lin, S.; Kleinberg, G.; Robertson, K.; Park, C.; Solberg, A.; Yang, Y.; Baynard, C.; Nadaf, N. M.; Beron, C. C.; Girasole, A. E.; Chantranupong, L.; Cortopassi, M. D.; Prouty, S.; Geistlinger, L.; Banks, A. S.; Scanlan, T. S.; Datta, S. R.; Greenberg, M. E.; Boulting, G. L.; Macosko, E. Z.; Sabatini, B. L. (2024). "Thyroid hormone remodels cortex to coordinate body-wide metabolism and exploration." Cell. 187 (20): 5679–5697.e23. doi:10.1016/j.cell.2024.07.041. PMID 39178853.
- Kim, S.; Wallace, M. L.; El-Rifai, M.; Knudsen, A. R.; Sabatini, B. L. (2022). "Co-packaging of opposing neurotransmitters in individual synaptic vesicles in the central nervous system." Neuron. 110 (8): 1371–1384.e7. doi:10.1016/j.neuron.2022.01.007. PMID 35120627.
- Lee, J.; Sabatini, B. L. (2021). "Striatal indirect pathway mediates exploration via collicular competition." Nature. 599 (7886): 645–649. doi:10.1038/s41586-021-04055-4. PMID 34732888.
- Melzer, S.; Newmark, E. R.; Mizuno, G. O.; Hyun, M.; Philson, A. C.; Quiroli, E.; Righetti, B.; Gregory, M. R.; Huang, K. W.; Levasseur, J.; Tian, L.; Sabatini, B. L. (2021). "Bombesin-like peptide recruits disinhibitory cortical circuits and enhances fear memories." Cell. 184 (22): 5622–5634.e25. doi:10.1016/j.cell.2021.09.013. PMID 34610277.

== Awards and honors ==
Sabatini was elected a Fellow of the American Association for the Advancement of Science (AAAS) in 2017. He was also a recipient of a McKnight Scholar Award from the McKnight Endowment Fund for Neuroscience.

== Personal life ==
Sabatini is the son of Argentine immigrants David D. Sabatini, a cell biologist at New York University, and Zulema Sabatini, a doctor. His older brother David M. Sabatini is also an M.D.–Ph.D. and was a professor at the Massachusetts Institute of Technology.
