= David M. Sabatini =

American biomedical scientist (born 1968)

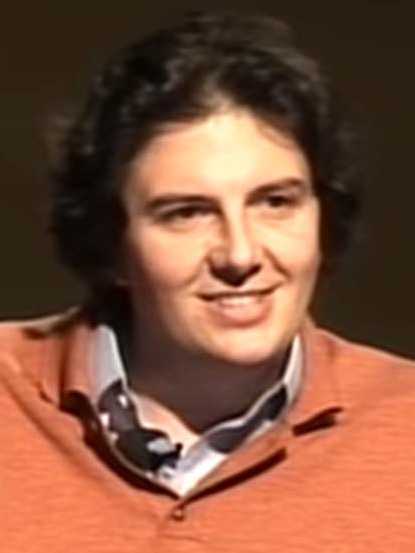
- Sabatini in 2013
- Born: 1968 (age 57–58); New York City, New York, U.S.
- Education: Brown University (BS); Johns Hopkins School of Medicine (MD, PhD)
- Known for: Co-discovery and study of mTOR
- Father: David D. Sabatini
- Relatives: Bernardo L. Sabatini (brother)
- Scientific career
- Fields: Biochemistry; Cell biology
- Workplaces: Whitehead Institute; Massachusetts Institute of Technology; Broad Institute; Institute of Organic Chemistry and Biochemistry
- Thesis: Control of translation by a novel, rapamycin-sensitive signaling pathway (1997)
- Doctoral advisor: Solomon H. Snyder

David Marcelo Sabatini (born 1968) is an American scientist and a former professor of biology at the Massachusetts Institute of Technology (MIT). From 2002 to 2021, he was a member of the Whitehead Institute for Biomedical Research. He was also an investigator of the Howard Hughes Medical Institute from 2008 to 2021 and was elected to the National Academy of Sciences in 2016. He is known for his contributions in the areas of cell signaling and cancer metabolism, most notably the co-discovery of mTOR.

In 2021 and 2022, Sabatini was fired from the Howard Hughes Medical Institute and resigned his positions at the Whitehead Institute and MIT, following allegations of sexual harassment. Sabatini denies the allegations. In October 2026, Sabatini won a defamation lawsuit against his accuser, Kristin Knouse, who was ordered to pay him over $6 million in damages.

== Biography ==
Sabatini was born in 1968 and raised in New York City to David D. Sabatini and Zulema Sabatini, both Argentine immigrants from Buenos Aires. He obtained his B.S. from Brown University followed by both his MD and his Ph.D. at Johns Hopkins School of Medicine, where he worked in the lab of Solomon H. Snyder. He joined the Whitehead Institute as a Whitehead Fellow in 1997, the same year he graduated from Johns Hopkins. In 2002 he became an assistant professor at MIT and a Member of the Whitehead Institute. He was promoted to tenured professor in 2006.

Sabatini's father, David D. Sabatini, is a cell biologist and professor emeritus at New York University. His younger brother, Bernardo L. Sabatini, is a neuroscientist and professor at Harvard Medical School.

Sabatini is the scientific founder of Navitor, Raze Therapeutics, and KSQ Therapeutics.

=== Misconduct allegations and litigation ===
In 2021, the Whitehead Institute, where Sabatini led a research laboratory, commissioned Hinckley Allen to investigate allegations of sexual harassment and inappropriate laboratory conduct. Central to the investigation were allegations by Kristin Knouse, a biologist leading her own Whitehead laboratory. She and Sabatini had begun a sexual relationship in 2018. It ended in early 2020 after he told her he was involved with biologist Lena Pernas, whom he married that December. In late 2020, Knouse accused Sabatini of sexual harassment in complaints to Whitehead director Ruth Lehmann and encouraged other researchers to complain. Sabatini maintained that the relationship was consensual.

The Hinckley Allen investigation concluded that Sabatini had violated institutional policies and fostered a sexualized laboratory environment. A 2023 Boston Globe Spotlight investigation documented poor judgment and policy violations but found that investigators "may have drawn overly severe conclusions in some areas."

In August 2021, Sabatini was forced to resign from Whitehead and dismissed by the Howard Hughes Medical Institute, which funded his research. He disputed the fairness of the Hinckley Allen investigation and sued Knouse, Whitehead and Lehmann that October. Knouse counterclaimed in December, alleging sexual harassment and retaliation.

A separate MIT investigation found that Sabatini had violated its policy on sexual relationships with people over whom faculty held a career-influencing role. He resigned his tenured professorship in April 2022 after officials recommended revoking his tenure. In May, he withdrew from consideration for a position at NYU Langone following student and faculty protests.

In November 2025, the court dismissed Sabatini's remaining gender-discrimination claim against Whitehead and Lehmann and narrowed his claims against Knouse, allowing defamation and tortious-interference claims to proceed.

On October 16, 2026, a Suffolk County jury found Knouse liable for defamation and tortious interference and awarded Sabatini $6 million plus interest. It also rejected all of Knouse's counterclaims, including sexual harassment and retaliation. The Boston Globe described the verdict as a "stark rejection of a high-profile #MeToo claim" from Knouse.

=== Independent funding and IOCB Prague ===
In February 2023, Bill Ackman and an unnamed partner announced $25 million to fund Sabatini's research, though it is unclear if he could successfully find an institution willing to host his lab or if one could be built independently. By November 2023, Sabatini had accepted a position at the Institute of Organic Chemistry and Biochemistry (IOCB) of the Czech Academy of Sciences in Prague, and in April 2024 it was announced that IOCB would open a Boston branch, where it was planned that Sabatini would spend part of his time. His lab now has two physical locations, one in Prague and the other in Boston (IOCB – Boston).

== Scientific contributions ==
As a graduate student in Solomon H. Snyder's lab at Johns Hopkins, Sabatini began working on understanding the molecular mechanism of rapamycin; a macrolide antibiotic discovered in the soil of Easter Island that has potent antifungal, immunosuppressive, and anti-tumorigenic properties. Although the TOR/DRR genes had been identified in 1993 as conferring rapamycin resistance in budding yeast, the direct target of rapamycin and its mechanism of action in mammals was unknown. In 1994, Sabatini used rapamycin and its binding partner FKBP12 to purify the mechanistic target of rapamycin (mTOR) protein from rat brain, showing it to be the direct target of rapamycin in mammals and the homolog of the yeast TOR/DRR genes.

Since starting his own lab at the Whitehead Institute in 1997, Sabatini has made numerous key contributions to the understanding of mTOR function, regulation, and importance in diseases such as cancer. For example, his lab discovered the mTORC1 and mTORC2 multi-protein complexes, the nutrient sensing Rag GTPase pathway upstream of mTORC1, as well as the direct amino acid sensors Sestrin and CASTOR.

mTOR signaling pathway

Sabatini's research interests have expanded in recent years to include cancer metabolism as well as technology development surrounding the use of high-throughput genetic screens in human cells, most notably through the use of RNA interference and the CRISPR-Cas9 system.

== Selected awards and honors ==
- 2009 Paul Marks Prize for Cancer Research
- 2014 NAS Award in Molecular Biology
- 2017 Lurie Prize in Biomedical Sciences
- 2019 Louisa Gross Horwitz Prize for contributions to cancer research
- 2020 BBVA Foundation Frontiers of Knowledge Awards in Biology and Biomedicine
- 2020 Nemmers Prize in Medical Science
- 2020 Sjöberg Prize from the Royal Swedish Academy of Sciences

== Selected publications ==
- Sabatini, DM (2017). "Twenty-five years of mTOR: Uncovering the link from nutrients to growth". Proc Natl Acad Sci U S A. 114 (45): 11818–11825. Bibcode:2017PNAS..11411818S. doi:10.1073/pnas.1716173114. PMC 5692607. PMID 29078414.
- Sabatini DM, Erdjument-Bromage H, Lui M, Tempst P, Snyder SH (1994). "RAFT1: a mammalian protein that binds to FKBP12 in a rapamycin-dependent fashion and is homologous to yeast TORs". Cell. 78 (1): 35–43. doi:10.1016/0092-8674(94)90570-3. PMID 7518356. S2CID 33647539.

== External link ==
- David Sabatini Lab
