= Eve Marder =

American neuroscientist

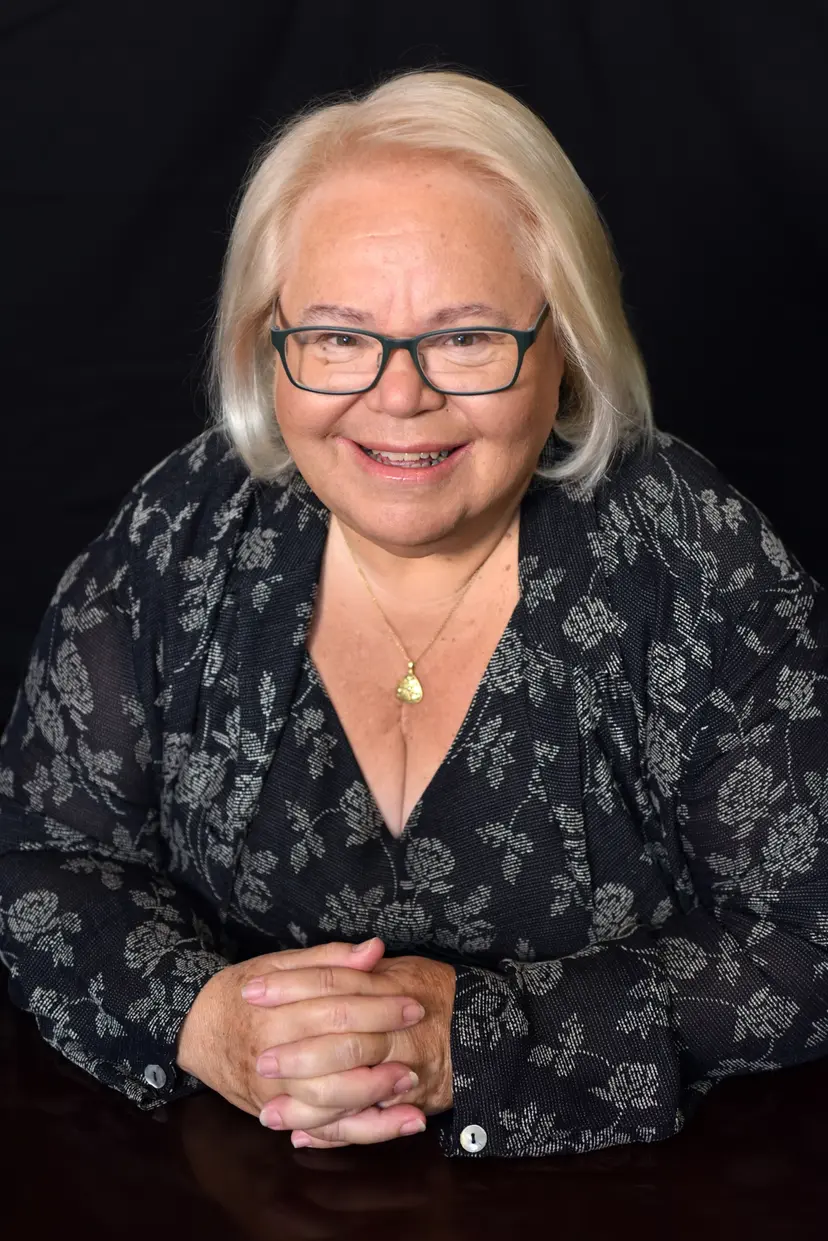
- Born: New York City
- Education: Brandeis University, University of California, San Diego
- Known for: Dynamic clamp method, studies on the stomatogastric nervous system
- Awards: National Medal of Science (2023); Pearl Meister Greengard Prize (2023); Kavli Prize (2016); Gruber Prize in Neuroscience (2013); Lashey Award (2012); Gerard Prize in Neuroscience (2005)
- Scientific career
- Fields: Neuroscience
- Workplaces: Brandeis University
- Doctoral advisor: Allen I. Selverston

Eve Marder is a University Professor and the Victor and Gwendolyn Beinfield Professor of Neuroscience at Brandeis University. At Brandeis, Marder is also a member of the Volen National Center for Complex Systems. Dr. Marder is known for her pioneering work on small neuronal networks which her team has interrogated via a combination of complementary experimental and theoretical techniques.

Marder is particularly well known in the community for her work on neural circuits in the crustacean stomatogastric nervous system (STNS), a small network of 30 neurons. She discovered that circuits are not “hard-wired” to produce a single output or behavior, but can be reconfigured by neuromodulators to produce many outputs and behaviors while still maintaining the integrity of the circuit. Her work has revolutionized the way scientists approach the studies of neural circuits with respect to the study of structural and functional behavior. The general principles that have resulted from her work are thought to be generally applicable to other neural networks, including those in humans. Marder has published 190 original research papers in refereed journals, and 179 review articles, book chapters, and opinion pieces.

Marder has received numerous awards for her pioneering work in the field including the National Medal of Science in 2023 and the Kavli Prize in 2016. She was also recognized as an outstanding woman scientist and was awarded the Pearl Meister Greengard Prize in 2023. In 2024, she was elected to the American Philosophical Society, and currently holds memberships in the Institute of Medicine, and National Academy of Sciences.

== Career, research, and service ==
Marder was born in Manhattan and raised on the east coast. Although she loved biology from an early age, Marder has shared that she held very diverse academic interests prior to starting her undergraduate degree and in fact entered Brandeis University as an undergraduate in 1965 with a plan to study politics and become a lawyer. She would instead find herself re-captivated by the world of biology and switched majors to Biology after her freshman year. Marder has shared that a pivotal turning point in her scientific self-development was writing a paper on schizophrenia during an abnormal psychology class during her junior year. Her subsequent library studies on inhibition in neural signaling solidified her career goals to become a neuroscientist and launched her on what would become her lifelong academic path.

Marder received her B.A. from Brandeis University in 1969 and subsequently completed Ph.D. studies at University of California, San Diego. It was during her time as a graduate student at UCSD that Marder would be introduced to the specific neural network, the lobster stomatogastric-ganglion system, that would prove pivotal for the rest of her academic career. Marder's doctoral work on the role of acetylcholine in the lobster STG led to a single-author paper in Nature. She completed her postdoctoral training at the University of Oregon in Eugene and the École Normale Supérieure in Paris, France. Marder subsequently began her independent research career at Brandeis University in 1978 as a faculty member in the department in Biology. In 1990 at Brandeis, she established one of the first undergraduate neuroscience programs in the United States. During her time as a PI, she has mentored 29 Ph.D. students and 52 postdoctoral fellows.

Her work on the 30 neurons that compose the crustacean stomatogastric ganglion (STG) produced many notable findings. She found that circuits can be modulated by many neuromodulators. She pioneered work on plasticity and homeostasis, revealing more about how the brain can change dramatically during learning and development yet remain structurally stable. Her recent work examining network variability among healthy individuals shows that a variety of network parameters can produce the same behavioral outcome, challenging a long-standing goal in theoretical neuroscience to model 'ideal' neurons and neural circuits. This led her to study the effects of temperature and other global perturbations on neural circuits through the context of climate change and the crustacean STNS.

Dr. Marder has contributed to the field of neuroscience with working spanning various topics. One of her first focuses was on the neuromodulatory configuration of neuronal circuits. At the time she began working on motor pattern generation in small circuits, it was believed that neurons had relatively unchangeable properties. This belief led researchers at the time to create connectivity diagrams that would reveal immediately how the circuit functioned. Marder showed that the application of neuromodulatory substances and neurons can alter the properties of circuit components, resulting in a changed circuit output. Other areas of investigation have included models of homeostatic regulation of intrinsic excitability, which notably led to the models of synaptic scaling by Gina Turrigiano and Sacha Nelson. Her lab also addressed how a circuit may have multiple solutions, and how individuals may resolve the same challenge by adjusting different parameters. They discovered that it is possible to construct models with varying values for the density given ion channels and still produce very similar activity patterns. Notably, in the 1990s with Larry Abbott, she helped develop the dynamic clamp method, which enables an experimenter to induce mathematically modeled conductances into living neurons to view the output of theoretical circuits. Eve has provided open-source resources like the "1.7 million model neurons" which allows individuals to construct and study how neural circuits function.

Presently, Marder's lab has been focused on the effects of climate change and environmental factors on circuit performance. They have investigated the consequences of global perturbations on individual variability, investigating specific factors including temperature, pH, and salinity. Marder's group discovered that there are "cryptic" changes that occur within the circuit as a consequence of the individual animal's temperature history, though these changes are only revealed when the system is exposed to an environmental challenge.

Marder has served on numerous editorial boards, and a broad range of review panels and working groups. Her service to the field of neuroscience has been extensive, with notable involvement in the BRAIN Initiative in 2013. She continues to be on the BRAIN advisory council to this day.

A book about Dr. Marder's life and scientific accomplishments was published in 2018, titled "Lessons from the Lobster: Eve Marder's Work in Neuroscience" by Charlotte Nassim. The book discusses Marder's early career, her scientific breakthroughs, impactful collaborations, and lessons she has learned throughout her long and successful career.

== Select publications ==
Eve Marder has an extensive publication record in the areas of neuromodulation, computational neuroscience, the dynamics of small networks, and neuropeptides. A selection of works are listed below:

- Marder, E.; Calabrese, R. L. (July 1, 1996). "Principles of rhythmic motor pattern generation". Physiological Reviews. 76 (3): 687–717. doi:10.1152/physrev.1996.76.3.687. ISSN 0031-9333. PMID 8757786.
- Bucher, Dirk; Marder, Eve (November 27, 2001). "Central pattern generators and the control of rhythmic movements". Current Biology. 11 (23): R986–R996. Bibcode:2001CBio...11.R986M. doi:10.1016/S0960-9822(01)00581-4. ISSN 0960-9822. PMID 11728329. S2CID 1294374.
- Marder, Eve; Bucher, Dirk; Prinz, Astrid A. (2004). "Similar network activity from disparate circuit parameters". Nature Neuroscience. 7 (12): 1345–1352. doi:10.1038/nn1352. ISSN 1546-1726. PMID 15558066. S2CID 6697491.
- Marder, E.; Abbott, L. F.; Turrigiano, G. (May 13, 1994). "Activity-dependent changes in the intrinsic properties of cultured neurons". Science. 264 (5161): 974–977. Bibcode:1994Sci...264..974T. doi:10.1126/science.8178157. ISSN 0036-8075. PMID 8178157.
- Sharp, A. A.; O'Neil, M. B.; Abbott, L. F.; Marder, E. (March 1, 1993). "Dynamic clamp: computer-generated conductances in real neurons". Journal of Neurophysiology. 69 (3): 992–995. doi:10.1152/jn.1993.69.3.992. ISSN 0022-3077. PMID 8463821.
- Marder, Eve; Goaillard, Jean-Marc; Schulz, David J. (2006). "Variable channel expression in identified single and electrically coupled neurons in different animals". Nature Neuroscience. 9 (3): 356–362. doi:10.1038/nn1639. ISSN 1546-1726. PMID 16444270. S2CID 19657439.
- Marder, Eve; Wood, Debra; Swensen, Andrew M.; Blitz, Dawn M.; Nusbaum, Michael P. (March 1, 2001). "The roles of co-transmission in neural network modulation". Trends in Neurosciences. 24 (3): 146–154. doi:10.1016/S0166-2236(00)01723-9. ISSN 0166-2236. PMID 11182454. S2CID 8994646.

== Notable awards ==
- Elected, American Philosophical Society (2024)
- National Medal of Science (2023)
- Pearl Meister Greengard Prize, Rockefeller University (2023)
- Landis Mentoring Award, NINDS (2023)
- Honorary Doctorate from University of Liège (2023)
- Honorary Doctorate from Princeton University (2022)
- National Academy of Science Award in the Neurosciences (2019)
- Honorary Doctorate from Tel Aviv University (2017)
- Kavli Prize in Neuroscience (2016)
- Gruber Neuroscience Prize (2013)
- Member, Institute of Medicine (2013)
- George A. Miller Prize, Cognitive Neuroscience Society (2012)
- Karl Spenser Lashley Prize, American Philosophical Society (2012)
- Honorary Doctor of Science, Bowdoin College (2010)
- Fellow, Biophysical Society (2008)
- President, Society for Neuroscience (2008)
- Member, National Academy of Sciences (2007)
- President-Elect, Society for Neuroscience (2006–2007)
- Gerard Prize, Society for Neuroscience (2005)
- Trustee of the Grass Foundation (2002–2005)
- Women in Neuroscience Mika Salpeter Lifetime Achievement Award (2002–2003)
- American Academy of Arts and Sciences (2001–2001)
- MERIT (Method to Extend Research in Time) Award, National Institutes of Health (1995–2000)
- McKnight Endowment fund for Neuroscience Investigator Award (1994)
- Jacob Javits Neuroscience Investigator Award, National Advisory Neurological and Communicative Disorders and Stroke Council (1987–1994)
