= Wulfram Gerstner =

German neuroscientist

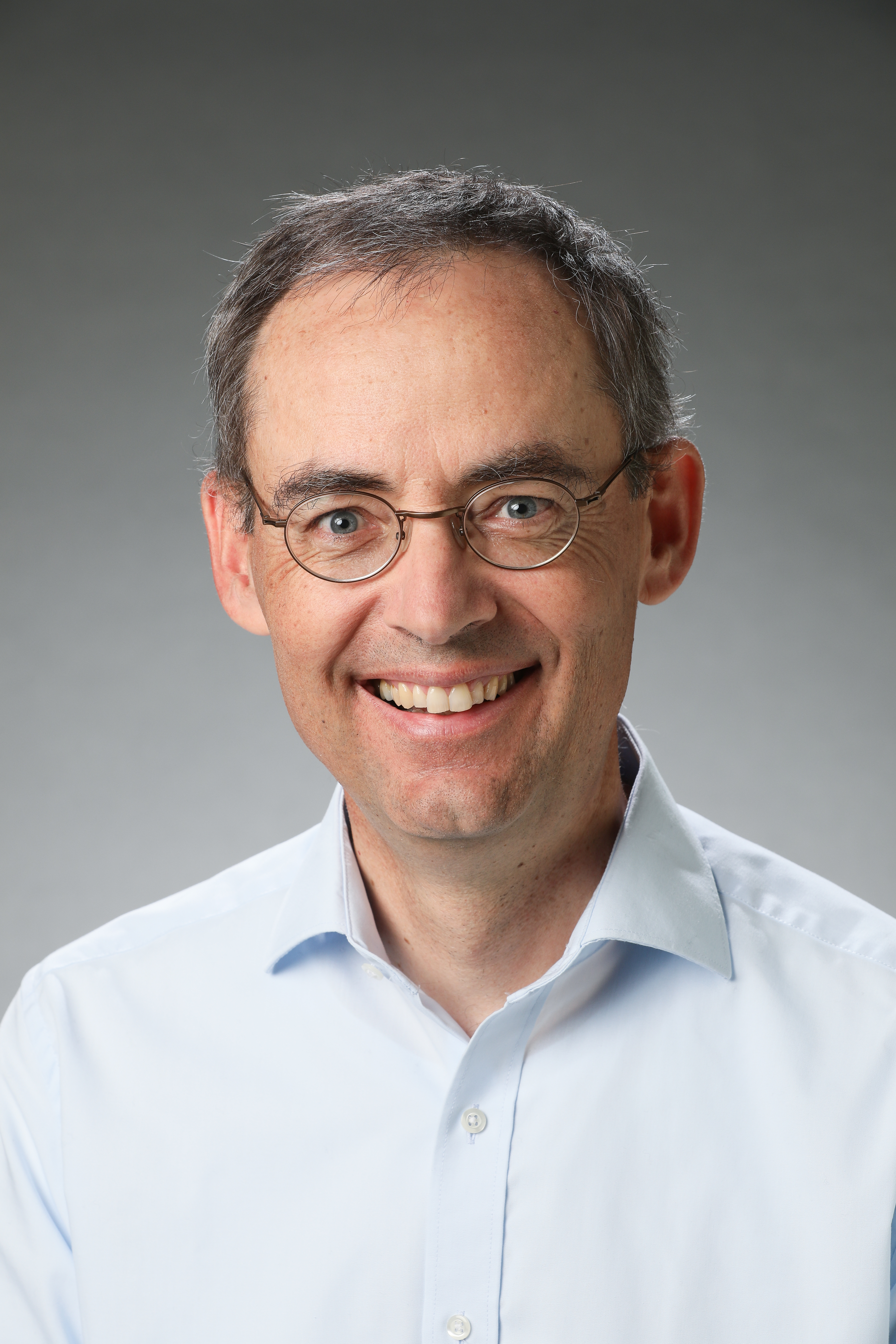
- Wulfram Gerstner in 2018
- Born: 1963 (age 62–63)
- Citizenship: German; Swiss
- Awards: Valentino Braitenberg Award for Computational Neuroscience 2018

Academic background
- Education: University of Tübingen; LMU Munich

Academic work
- Discipline: Neuroscience
- Sub-discipline: Computational neuroscience
- Institutions: École Polytechnique Fédérale de Lausanne (EPFL)
- Main interests: Dynamic models neural activity Spike-timing-dependent plasticity (STDP); Neuronal coding Hippocampal models Spatial representation
- Website: https://www.epfl.ch/labs/lcn/

Wulfram Gerstner (born 1963 in Heilbronn) is a German and Swiss computational neuroscientist. His research focuses on neural spiking patterns in neural networks, and their connection to learning, spatial representation and navigation. Since 2006 Gerstner has been a full professor of Computer Science and Life Sciences at École Polytechnique Fédérale de Lausanne (EPFL), where he also serves as a Director of the Laboratory of Computational Neuroscience.

== Career ==
Gerstner studied physics at the University of Tübingen and at LMU Munich. In 1989, he received his Master's degree with a thesis in experimental quantum optics. He then joined the theoretical biophysics group of William Bialek at University of California, Berkeley as a visiting researcher. He received his PhD in theoretical physics from the Technical University of Munich in 1993 under supervision from Leo van Hemmen. He did postdoctoral work at Brandeis University and at the Technical University of Munich, where he worked in theoretical neuroscience.

In 1996, he was nominated as assistant professor and in February 2001, he was promoted as an associate professor with tenure at EPFL. In August 2006, Gerstner was appointed full professor at EPFL in both the School of Computer and Communication Sciences and the School of Life Sciences.

== Research ==
Gerstner's research is focused on models of spiking neurons, spike-timing-dependent plasticity (STDP), neuronal coding in single neurons and neuron populations. He also investigates models of the hippocampus and their application in the spatial representation for navigation of rat-like autonomous agents.

He is also one of the initiators of The Deep Artificial Composer (DAC), a deep-learning algorithm that can generate melodies by imitating a given style of music.

== Books ==
Gerstner is the author of neuroscientific text books such as Spiking Neuron Models: Single neurons, populations, plasticity (Gerstner, W. and Kistler, W.M., 2002, Cambridge University Press) that introduced the field of spiking neural networks, and Neuronal dynamics: From single neurons to networks and models of cognition (Gerstner, W., Kistler, W.M., Naud, R. and Paninski, L., 2014, Cambridge University Press) on the field of computational neuroscience that was also published as an online version including exercises and video lectures.

== Selected publications ==
- Gerstner, Wulfram (2000). "Population Dynamics of Spiking Neurons: Fast Transients, Asynchronous States, and Locking" (PDF). Neural Computation. 12 (1): 43–89. doi:10.1162/089976600300015899. PMID 10636933. S2CID 7832768.
- Clopath, Claudia; Büsing, Lars; Vasilaki, Eleni; Gerstner, Wulfram (2010). "Connectivity reflects coding: A model of voltage-based STDP with homeostasis" (PDF). Nature Neuroscience. 13 (3): 344–352. doi:10.1038/nn.2479. hdl:10044/1/21440. PMID 20098420. S2CID 8046538.
- Gerstner, Wulfram; Kempter, Richard; Van Hemmen, J. Leo; Wagner, Hermann (1996). "A neuronal learning rule for sub-millisecond temporal coding" (PDF). Nature. 383 (6595): 76–78. Bibcode:1996Natur.383...76G. doi:10.1038/383076a0. PMID 8779718. S2CID 4319500.
- Brette, Romain; Gerstner, Wulfram (2005). "Adaptive Exponential Integrate-and-Fire Model as an Effective Description of Neuronal Activity" (PDF). Journal of Neurophysiology. 94 (5): 3637–3642. doi:10.1152/jn.00686.2005. PMID 16014787.
- Kempter, Richard; Gerstner, Wulfram; Van Hemmen, J. Leo (1999). "Hebbian learning and spiking neurons" (PDF). Physical Review E. 59 (4): 4498–4514. Bibcode:1999PhRvE..59.4498K. doi:10.1103/PhysRevE.59.4498.

== Distinctions ==
Gerstner has been an editorial board member of journals such as Science, The Journal of Neuroscience, Network: Computation in Neural Systems, Journal of Computational Neuroscience, and Neural Computation.

He is the recipient of the Valentino Braitenberg Award for Computational Neuroscience 2018 and in 2010 he was awarded an ERC Advanced Grant by the European Research Council. Gerstner is an elected member of the Academy of Sciences and Literature Mainz.
