= Haim Sompolinsky =

Israeli theoretical neuroscientist (born 1949)

- חיים סומפולינסקי
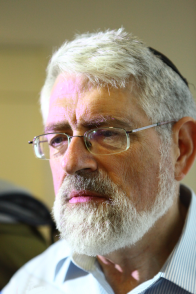
- Born: October 14, 1949 (age 76); Copenhagen
- Awards: Landau Prize for Brain Science (2008); Swartz Prize for Theoretical and Computational Neuroscience (2011); Mathematical Neuroscience Prize from Israel Brain Technologies (2013); Gruber Neuroscience Prize (2022); ICTP Dirac Medal (2026)
- Scientific career
- Fields: Computational Neuroscience; Statistical Physics
- Workplaces: Hebrew University of Jerusalem; Harvard University

Haim Sompolinsky (Hebrew: חיים סומפולינסקי; born 1949) is the William N. Skirball Professor of Neuroscience at the Edmond and Lily Safra Center for Brain Sciences (formerly the Interdisciplinary Center for Neural Computation), and a professor of physics at the Racah Institute of Physics at the Hebrew University of Jerusalem. He is also a visiting professor in the Center of Brain Science at Harvard University and the director of Harvard's Swartz Program in Theoretical Neuroscience. He is widely regarded as one of the leaders of theoretical neuroscience.

== Biography ==
Haim Sompolinsky was born in Copenhagen, Denmark. He received his Ph.D. in physics from Bar-Ilan University in Israel in 1980. He then worked as postdoctoral fellow in the physics department at Harvard University until 1982, under the supervision of Professor Bertrand Halperin.

== Scientific career ==
Sompolinsky was appointed associate professor of physics at Bar-Ilan University until 1986, when he moved to the Hebrew University of Jerusalem as professor of physics. Sompolinsky's research in theoretical physics covered the fields of phase transitions, critical phenomena, nonlinear dynamics and the statistical mechanics of spin glasses. Since the mid-1980s, he has pioneered the new field of computational neuroscience, introducing methods and concepts of theoretical physics to the study of neuronal circuits, memory, learning and neuronal information processing.

In 1992, he helped found Hebrew University's Interdisciplinary Center for Neural Computation and served as its director from 2008 to 2010. He is currently the William N. Skirball Professor of Neuroscience and serves on the executive board of the newly established Edmond and Lily Safra Center for Brain Sciences at the Hebrew University. He was a visiting scholar at several institutions, including Bell Laboratories and New York University, and serves on the faculty of the Methods in Computational Neuroscience Course at the Marine Biology Lab.

Sompolinsky's research includes spike-based neural learning and computation, neuronal population codes, sensory representations, dynamics and function of sensory and motor cortical circuits, and large-scale structure and dynamics of human brain. He also studies the relation between physics, neuroscience, and human volition, freedom and agency.

From 2006, Sompolinsky has served as a visiting professor in the Center of Brain Science at Harvard University and the director of Harvard's Swartz Program in Theoretical Neuroscience.

In 2022, Sompolinsky was elected fellow of the Israel Physical Society.

== Awards and recognition ==
- Foreign Honorary Member of the American Academy of Arts and Sciences, 2008
- Landau Prize for Brain Science, 2008
- Swartz Prize for Theoretical and Computational Neuroscience of the US Society for Neuroscience, 2011
- Mathematical Neuroscience Prize from Israel Brain Technologies, 2013
- The EMET Prize for Art, Science and Culture (Brain Science), 2016
- Gruber Neuroscience Prize, 2022
- The Brain Prize, 20246
- ICTP Dirac Medal, 2026
