= Birdsey Renshaw =

American neuroscientist (1911–1948)

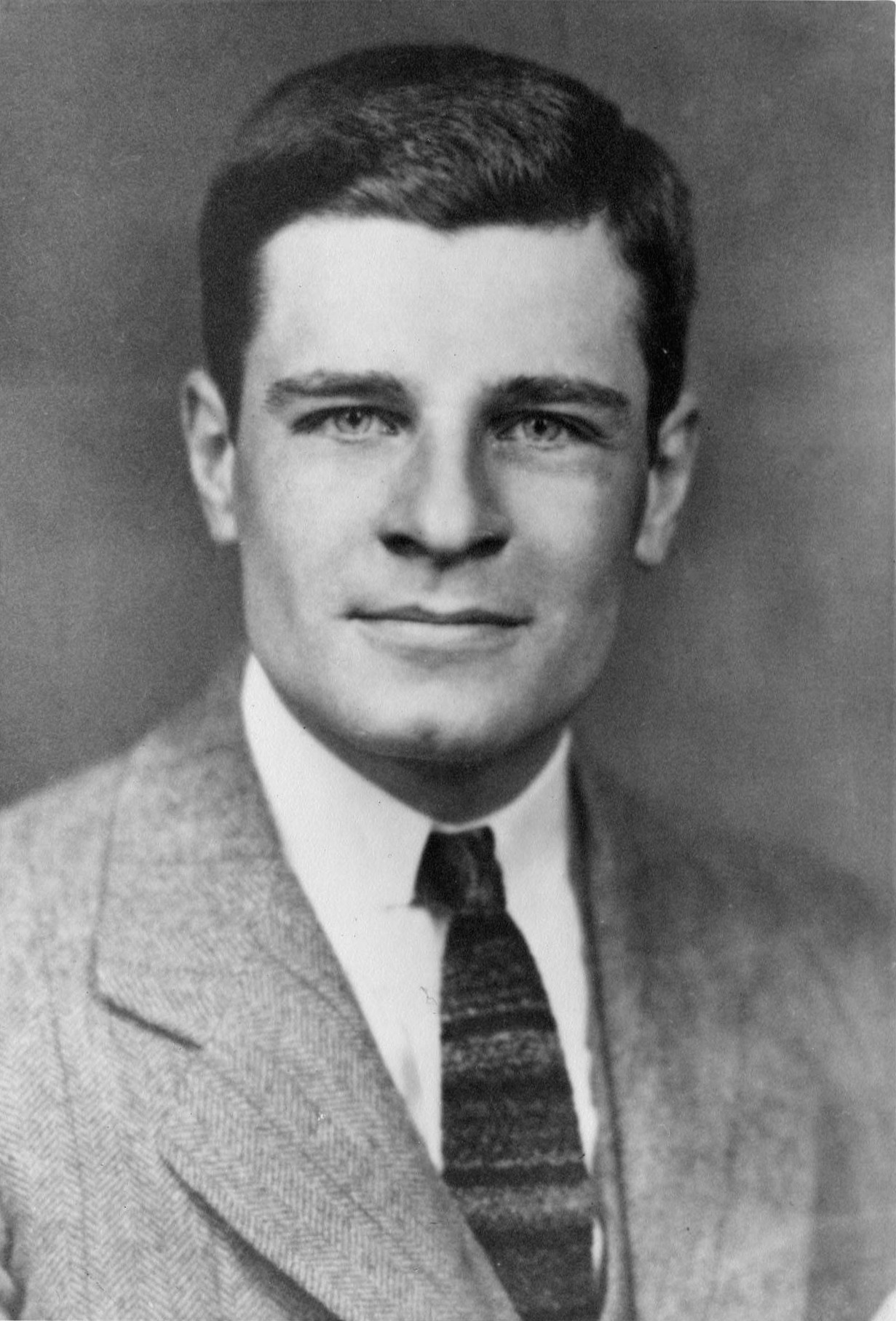
- Born: October 10, 1911; Middletown, Connecticut
- Died: November 23, 1948 (aged 37); Portland, Oregon
- Education: Harvard Medical School
- Scientific career
- Fields: Neuroscience

Birdsey Renshaw (October 10, 1911 – November 23, 1948) was an American electrophysiologist and neuroscientist. He is known for his 1941 discovery of the eponymous Renshaw cells and the Renshaw inhibition (recurrent inhibition), which is a negative feedback mechanism associated with the Renshaw cell action.

== Biography ==
In 1936 he graduated with an M.D. from Harvard Medical School and then joined Alexander Forbes's neurophysiological research team in Harvard Medical School's physiology department. There he learned how to record cerebral action potentials using amplifiers and cathode-ray tubes. He developed microelectrodes from ultra-clean Pyrex pipettes and applied the microelectrodes to make extracellular recordings of action potentials found in the mammalian hippocampus and cortex. In 1938 he received his PhD with thesis The Electrical Potentials Recorded in the Brain with Microelectrodes.

In 1938, after receiving his PhD. he joined Herbert Spencer Gasser's group at the Rockefeller Institute for Medical Research (now named Rockefeller University). The research group included David Lloyd (1911–1985), Rafael Lorente de Nó, and Harry Grundfest.

In 1948 Renshaw died of polio within three days of the onset of symptoms.

In 1954 Eccles, Fatt, and Koketsu used intracellular recording to confirm Renshaw's findings and introduced the term "Renshaw cell".

== Family ==
Birdsey Renshaw's mother was Laura Birdsey Renshaw (1878–1930) and his father was Raemer Rex Renshaw (1880–1938), a professor of organic chemistry at New York University and, during WW I, a U.S. Army captain in the Chemical Warfare Service. Late on the night of September 23, 1938, Professor Raemer Rex Renshaw and his second wife died after falling nineteen stories from their Tudor City apartment at 45 Prospect Place in Manhattan.

In August 1939 in Holyoke, Massachusetts, Birdsey Renshaw married Janet Card Hayes, who graduated from Mount Holyoke College. She had two brothers and two sisters. The younger of her two brothers was Samuel Perkins Hayes Jr. (1910–2002), who was a social psychologist, a consultant to the Peace Corps from 1961 to 1969, and president of the Foreign Policy Association until 1975. Birdsey and Janet Renshaw had two sons, Thomas Hayes Renshaw and Bruce Birdsey Renshaw.

== Selected publications ==
- Forbes, A.; Renshaw, B.; Rempel, B. (1937). "Units of electrical activity in the cerebral cortex". American Journal of Physiology. 119: 309–310.
- —— (1938). The Electrical Potentials Recorded in the Brain with Microelectrodes (PhD thesis). Harvard University.
- ——; Forbes, A. (1938). "Electrical activity of the hippocampus recorded with microelectrodes". Int. Physiol. Congress. II. pp. 221–223.
- —— (1940). "Activity in the simplest spinal reflex pathways". Journal of Neurophysiology. 3 (5): 373–387. doi:10.1152/jn.1940.3.5.373.
- ——; Forbes, A.; Morison, B. R. (1940). "Activity of Isocortex and Hippocampus: Electrical Studies with Micro-Electrodes". Journal of Neurophysiology. 3: 74–105. doi:10.1152/jn.1940.3.1.74.
- —— (1941). "Influence of Discharge of Motoneurons Upon Excitation of Neighboring Motoneurons". Journal of Neurophysiology. 4 (2): 167–183. doi:10.1152/jn.1941.4.2.167.
- ——; Therman, Per Olof (1941). "Excitation of Intraspinal Mammalian Axons by Nerve Impulses in Adjacent Axons". American Journal of Physiology. Legacy Content. 133: 96–105. doi:10.1152/ajplegacy.1941.133.1.96.
- —— (1942). "Effects of Presynaptic Volleys on Spread of Impulses over the Soma of the Motoneuron". Journal of Neurophysiology. 5 (3): 235–243. doi:10.1152/jn.1942.5.3.235.
- —— (1942). "Reflex Discharges in Branches of the Crural Nerve". Journal of Neurophysiology. 5 (6): 487–498. doi:10.1152/jn.1942.5.6.487.
- —— (1943). "Nerve and Synaptic Transmission". Annual Review of Physiology. 5: 253–274. doi:10.1146/annurev.ph.05.030143.001345.
- ——; Gates, M. (1946). "Di-sulfur decafluoride". Chemical Warfare Agents and Related Chemical Problems (Parts I–II), Summary Technical Report of Division. Washington, DC: U.S. Office of Scientific Research and Development. pp. 24–29.
- Cope, A. C.; Gates, M.; —— (1946). "Nitrogen mustards". Chemical Warfare Agents and Related Chemical Problems (Parts I–II), Summary Technical Report of Division. Washington, DC: U.S. Office of Scientific Research and Development. pp. 59–82.
- Cope, A. C.; Dee, J.; Cannan, R. K.; ——; Moore, S. (1946). "Ricin". Chemical Warfare Agents and Related Chemical Problems (Parts I–II), Summary Technical Report of Division. Washington, DC: U.S. Office of Scientific Research and Development. pp. 179–203.
- —— (1946). "Miscellaneous toxicological studies". Chemical warfare agents and related chemical problems (Parts I–II), Summary Technical Report of Division. Washington, DC: U.S. Office of Scientific Research and Development. pp. 382–385.
- —— (1946). "Mechanisms in production of cutaneous injuries by sulfur and nitrogen mustards". Chemical warfare agents and related chemical problems (Parts III–VI), Summary Technical Report of Division. Washington, DC: U.S. Office of Scientific Research and Development. pp. 479–518.
- —— (May 1, 1946). "Central effects of centripetal impulses in axons of spinal ventral roots". Journal of Neurophysiology. 9 (3): 191–204. doi:10.1152/jn.1946.9.3.191. PMID 21028162.
- —— (1946). "Observations on Interaction of Nerve Impulses in the Gray Matter and on the Nature of Central Inhibition". American Journal of Physiology. Legacy Content. 146 (3): 443–448. doi:10.1152/ajplegacy.1946.146.3.443. PMID 20989256.
- —— (1947). "Observations on the Role of Water in the Susceptibility of Human Skin to Injury by Vesicant Vapors". Journal of Investigative Dermatology. 9 (2): 71–85. doi:10.1038/jid.1947.71. PMID 20266663.
