= Pittenger =

Pittenger is a surname. Notable people with the surname include:

- Christopher Pittenger (born 1972), American psychiatrist and neuroscientist
- John Pittenger (1930–2009), American lawyer and politician
- L. A. Pittenger (1873–1953), American university president
- Norman Pittenger (1905–1997), American minister and theologian
- Pinky Pittenger (1899–1977), American baseball player
- Robert Pittenger (born 1948), American businessman and politician
- William Pittenger (1840–1904), Union Army soldier involved in the Great Locomotive Chase
- William Alvin Pittenger (1885–1951), American politician

== Other uses ==
- Pittenger Cottage

== See also ==
- Pittinger (surname)
