= Sten Grillner =

Swedish neuroscientist

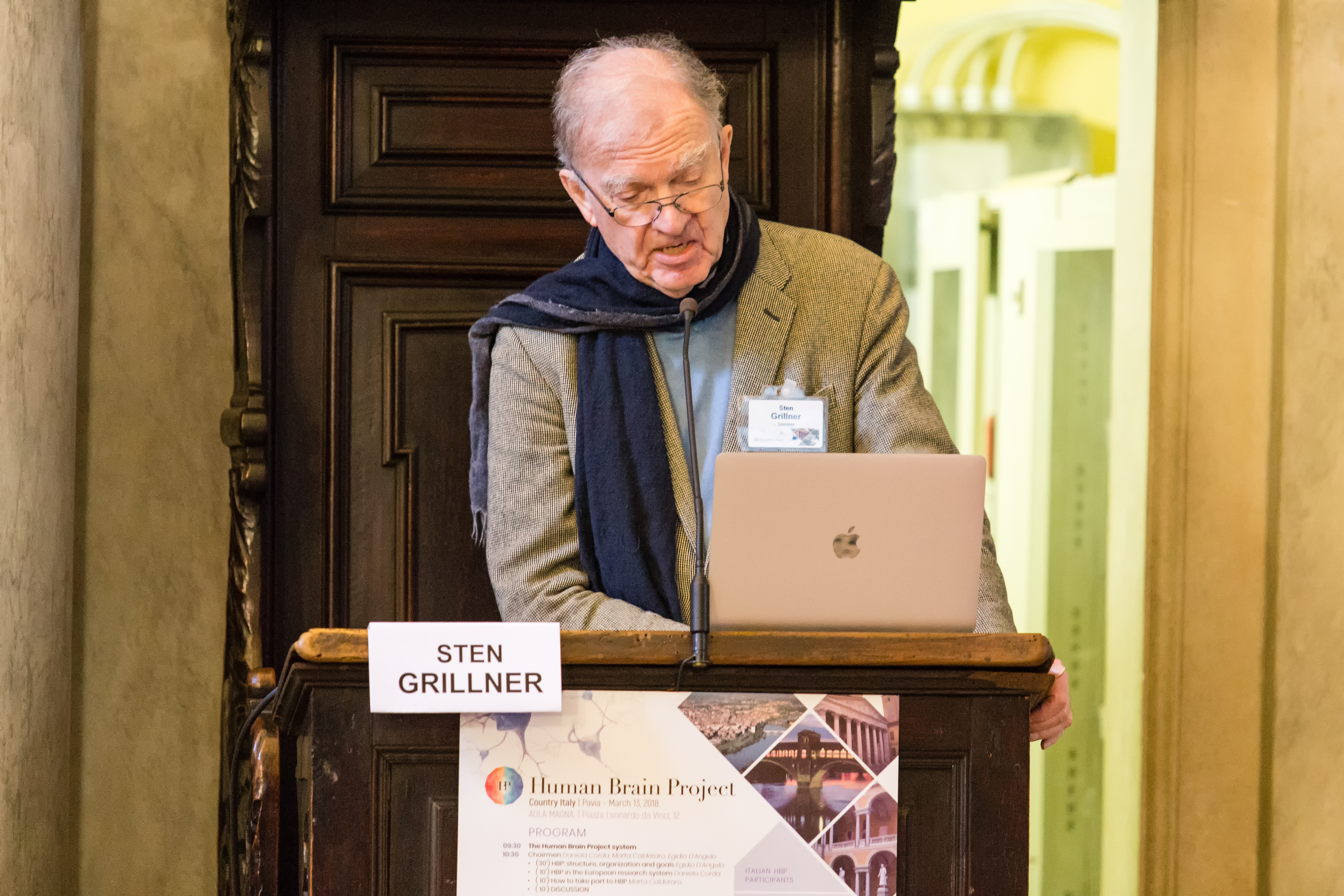
- Born: June 14, 1941 (age 85); Stockholm, Sweden
- Education: University of Gothenburg MD; PhD
- Known for: Former chair of the Nobel Prize in Physiology or Medicine (20 Years)
- Awards: Kavli Prize in Neuroscience, Bristol-Myers Squibb award, Ralph Gerard prize.
- Scientific career
- Fields: Neuroscience, Neurophysiology
- Workplaces: Karolinska Institutet

Sten Grillner (born 14 June 1941, Stockholm) is a Swedish neurophysiologist and Director of the Karolinska Institute's Nobel Institute for Neurophysiology in Stockholm. He is considered one of the world's foremost experts in the cellular bases of motor behaviour. His research is focused on understanding the cellular bases of motor behaviour; in particular, he has shown how neuronal circuits in the spine help control rhythmic movements, such as those needed for locomotion. He served as President of the Federation of European Neuroscience Societies (FENS) between 2010 and 2012, and Secretary General of the International Brain Research Organization (IBRO) between 2012 and 2015.

Neuroscientist Eric Kandel has named Grillner's work on the workings of complex neurocircuitry extremely important and that this progress in understanding motor systems, the cognitive role in motor systems, is a brilliant advance and that it has revolutionized our understanding of how the nervous system is wired.

Grillner studied at the medical faculty in Gothenburg, Sweden, and received his Doctor of Medicine (MD); PhD in neurophysiology in 1969. He has been a Professor and Director of the Nobel Institute for Neurophysiology at the Karolinska Institute since 1987. He is a member of the Academia Europaea, Royal Swedish Academy of Science, National Academy of Sciences (US), Institute of Medicine (US) and former member, deputy chair and chairperson between 1988 and 2008 of the Nobel Assembly at Karolinska Institutet which awards Nobel Prize in Physiology or Medicine. He has received a number of awards including the Bristol-Myers Squibb Award in 1993 and the Reeve–Irvine award in 2002. He was the co-recipient of the 2005 SfN Ralph Gerard Prize, the highest recognition conferred by Society for Neuroscience, and a co-recipient of the inaugural Kavli Prize for Neuroscience in 2008, alongside Thomas Jessell and Pasko Rakic.

== Research ==
His research has focused on the extraordinary capability of the brain to control movement. Early on he demonstrated that networks within the mammalian spinal cord can produce the detailed motor pattern of locomotion involving the coordination of hundreds of different muscles. In a paper published in 1987, he and James Buchanan provided a putative network scheme of interacting interneurons in the lamprey spinal cord, a model vertebrate system. The level of detail gained in this work is unique in that it has allowed changes in behaviour to be related to changes occurring at the cellular and network level. His later work is directed towards understanding the forebrain mechanisms underlying selection of behavior, and has shown that the organization of the basal ganglia, dopamine system, habenulae and pallium is evolutionarily conserved in considerable detail over more than 500 million years.

He is a member of the Norwegian Academy of Science and Letters.
