= Dominick P. Purpura =

American neuroscientist (1927–2019)

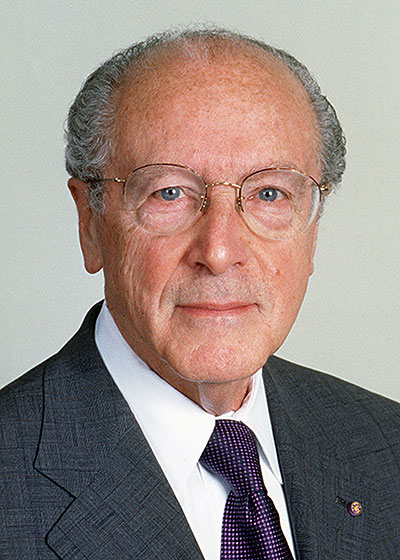
Dominick P Purpura Headshot

Dominick P. Purpura (April 2, 1927 – May 16, 2019) was a neuroscientist. who was well known for his research focused on intellectual disability. His work also focused on the origin of brain waves, developmental neurobiology, and epilepsy. From 1982 to 1983, Purpura was appointed as the president of the Society for Neuroscience. In 1984, he was recruited to be the dean of Albert Einstein College of Medicine of Yeshiva University. He served as the dean for a total of 22 years.

== Personal life ==
Purpura was born in Manhattan, New York on April 2, 1927 and grew up on the Upper East Side. After World War II, Purpura served in the United States Air Force. In 1948, Dr. Purpura married Florence Williams and eventually had four children: Craig, Kent, Keith, and Allyson. Along with four children, he also had four grandchildren. In his later years, Purpura resided in Manhattan, New York with his wife. He died at the age of 92 on May 16, 2019, .

== Education and career ==
In 1949, Dominick P. Purpura earned his Bachelor's degree from Columbia University. He graduated magna cum laude from Harvard Medical School with a Medical degree. Purpura went on to teach at Columbia University Vagelos College of Physicians and Surgeons before being recruited to teach and be the chair of anatomy at the Albert Einstein College of Medicine of Yeshiva University in 1967. He left Einstein in 1982 to be the dean of the Stanford University School of Medicine, however he went back to the Albert Einstein College of Medicine in 1984 where he remained for the rest of his career.

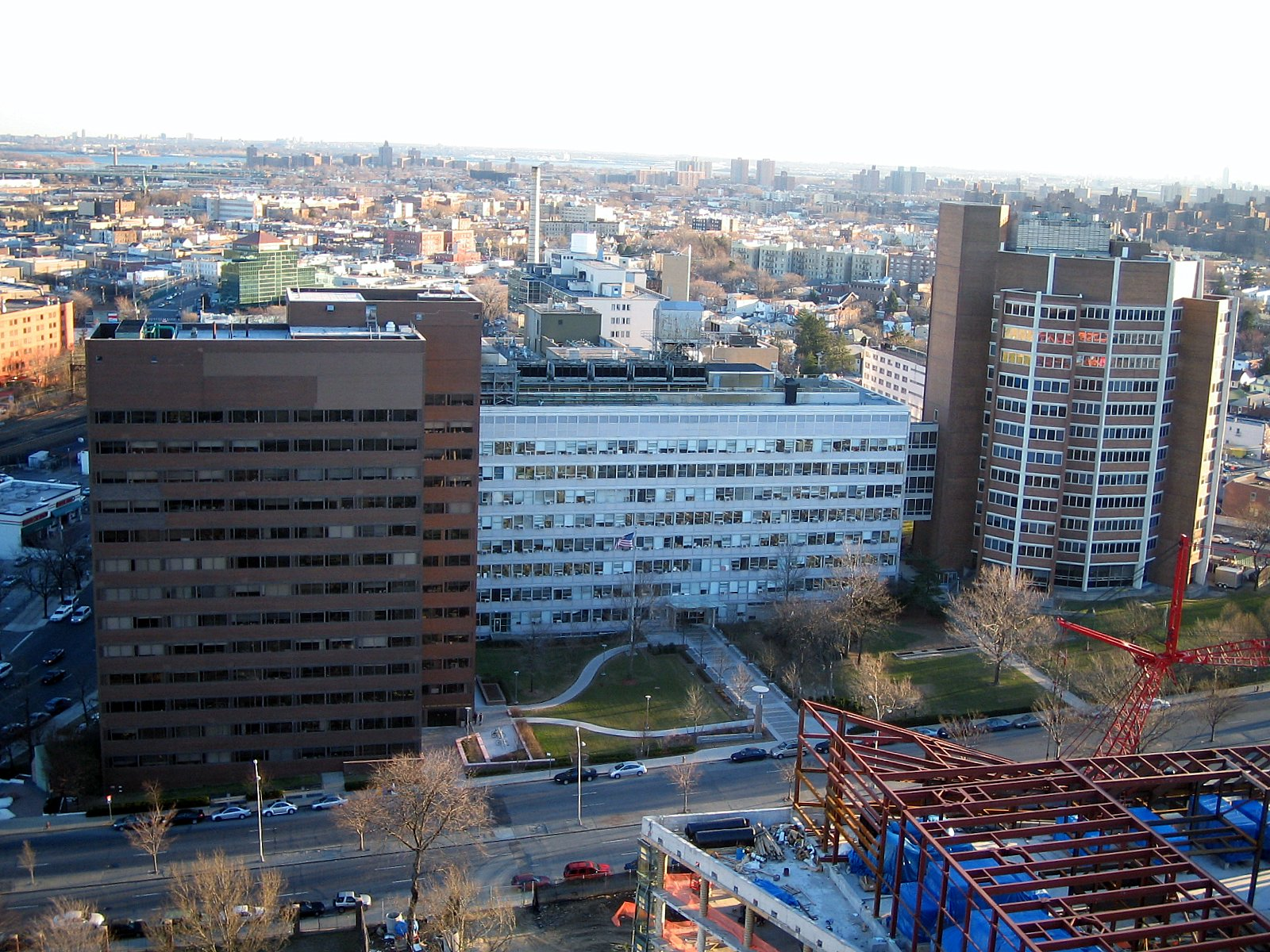
An image of the Albert Einstein College of Medicine of Yeshiva University

=== Albert Einstein College of Medicine of Yeshiva University ===
After being recruited in 1967, Purpura served as the Scientific Director of the Einstein's Rose F. Kennedy Center for Mental Retardation and Developmental Disabilities from 1969 to 1972. The center focused on both developmental and intellectual disabilities, which were also the focus of Purpura's research. After two years as the scientific director, he was appointed as the center's director. In 1974, he founded the neuroscience department at the university. For a brief moment, Purpura was the dean of Stanford's School of Medicine but his heart belonged to Albert Einstein College of Medicine of Yeshiva University. By 1984, Purpura achieved the status of dean of the university. Purpura is duly recognized as "the longest-serving dean of any medical school in the United States" after serving a total of 22 years at Einstein. Due to this long term served, Purpura was able to accomplish many things throughout his career. During his time as Dean, Purpura was quoted as positioning Einstein as the "educational hub" of the five major teaching hospitals in New York : Monteflore Medical Center, Bronx-Lebanon Hospital Center, Jacobi Medical Center, North Shore-Long Island Jewish Health System, Beth Israel Medical Center. Since his retirement in 2006, the neuroscience department at the College of Medicine has been named after him as a way to recognize both his leadership at the university and in the field of neuroscience. Throughout Purpura's professional and academic career he published over 200 scientific articles and chapters.

=== Society for Neuroscience ===
In 1982, Purpura was appointed as the president for the Society of Neuroscience for a one year term. During his time as president, Dominick Purpura oversaw the Long-Range Planning Report which helped define the structure, policies, and programs of the Society. The Report resulted in a much more well-rounded society that focused on education and increasing the diversity of the Society.

== Research ==
Dominick Purpura's research centered on intellectual disability, developmental neurobiology, brain waves, and epilepsy. In 2009, Purpura along with colleague Mark F. Mehler researched the relationship between an unregulated noradrenergic system during development and Autism Spectrum Disorders. The noradrenergic receptors are involved with stress response, learning, memory and more. Their hypothesis resulted in further research in the field in an attempt to discover ways to target this system to help those with autistic disorders.

Purpura also researched the relationship between brain wave activity and temperature using golden hamsters. His research in this area resulted in the discovery that hamsters show no brain waves below a bodily temperature of 19 degrees Celsius. This discovery lead to investigation of the connection between temperature and the activity of the nervous system.

Along with a few other colleagues, Dr. Purpura studied electrical stimulation to the human cortex. They showed that direct stimulation to the human cortex resulted in a negative response, then a slow positive response, and a slower negative response. This study lead to further investigation of possible surgeries to help those with epilepsy.

== Connections ==
Purpura came to have many valuable connections throughout his career as a neuroscientist. As he was the Dean of the Albert Einstein College of Medicine at Yeshiva University, he came to know many other neuroscientists such as Bernard Cohen (Mt. Sinai), Carlos A. Diaz-Balzac (Yeshiva University), and Steven U. Walkley (Albert Einstein). One of Purpura's most significant colleagues was Harry Grundfest (Columbia University). Between the two of them and various other colleagues, they wrote over 40 published papers between 1951 and 1955. They also laid groundbreaking research for neuropharmacology. Their findings involved how to use pharmacological devices to obtain critical information about the system that was being researched. As he was influenced by his predecessors, his teachings influenced those he had touched in his later years. Others such as Pasko Rakic and Norman Lamm were some of his colleagues during his time as dean. Edward R. Burns M.D. (executive dean at Einstein) shared that Purpura revolutionized how medical education was taught.

== Awards and honors ==
Throughout his career, Dr. Purpura received an abundance of awards. His progress in the field of neuroscience was repetitively acknowledged. The following are included among his many awards:

- National Medical Research Award (1988)
- Excellence in Science and Technology (1988)
- AES Clinical Science Research Award (1992)
- Presidential Award from the Society of Neuroscience (1996)

He also held a variety of leadership roles throughout his career including the president of the Eastern Association of Encephalographs, the American Epilepsy Society, the Society for Neuroscience, and the International Brain Research Association. Purpura also was a member of the Neurology A Study Section of the National Institutes of Health. He was also a candidate for the directorial position at the National Institutes of Health in 1990.
