= Angélique Arvanitaki =

French neurophysiologist (1901–1983)

- Born: 11 July 1901; Cairo, Egypt
- Died: 6 October 1983 (aged 82); Marseille, France
- Other names: Angélique Arvanitaki-Chalazonitis
- Scientific career
- Fields: Neurophysiology

Angélique Arvanitaki (French pronunciation: [ɑ̃ʒelik aʁvanitaki]; 11 July 1901 – 6 October 1983) was a French neurophysiologist who did research on the electrical activity of neurons using the large nerve fibres of several different molluscs.

== Life ==
Angélique Arvanitaki was of Greek origin and was born in Cairo on 11 July 1901. In 1942, she married Nick Chalazonitis, who was a student in veterinary medicine at the time, and would himself become a neurophysiologist too. Their daughter Alcmene Chalazonitis, born in 1943, later also became a neuroscientist.

== Research ==
Arvanitaki contributed to the field of neurophysiology with research that explored the giant nerve fibres in genera of gastropods, the sea hare Aplysia and the land snail Helix. She developed the concept of ganglion preparation of large identifiable nerves. Arvanitaki also discovered that regular electrical oscillations could periodically grow in size until a series of action potentials were fired along isolated nerve fibres of the cuttlefish, genus Sepia. A further contribution of Arvanitaki was the demonstration that a neuronal circuit was not required for a single nerve to produce rhythmic and spontaneous activity. Also, she discovered that when two nerve fibres are close in proximity, the activity of a single nerve fibre can generate activity in a nearby nerve fibre a phenomenon she named ephaptic coupling. Arvanitaki and her husband Chalazonitis both explored the methodology of electrophysiological activity of the nervous system of the sea hare genus Aplysia. In 1955, Arvanitaki and Chalazonitis as well as Ladislav Tauc created the first intracellular recordings of large neurons of the California sea hare. Arvanitaki's and Chalazonitis' explored photoexcitability of certain neurons.

Arvanitaki's work was, however, overshadowed by Hodgkin and Huxley's work on the giant axon of the squid.
