= Thomas Jessell =

American biochemist (1951–2019)

- Photo by Jill LeVine
- Born: Thomas Michael Jessell; 2 August 1951; London, United Kingdom
- Died: 28 April 2019 (aged 67)
- Education: University of Cambridge
- Awards: Ralph W. Gerard Prize in Neuroscience (2016); Gruber Prize in Neuroscience (2014); Gairdner Foundation International Award (2012); Perl-UNC Prize (2009); Kavli Prize (2008); March of Dimes Prize in Developmental Biology (2001)
- Scientific career
- Fields: Neuroscience
- Workplaces: Columbia University; Harvard University; Howard Hughes Medical Institute
- Thesis: Regulation of the Release of Substance P and Other Putative Neurotransmitters from Mammalian Brain In Vitro (1977)
- Academic advisors: Gerald Fischbach
- Notable students: Thomas Reardon; James Briscoe; Silvia Arber; Marc Tessier-Lavigne

Thomas Michael Jessell (2 August 1951 – 28 April 2019) was the Claire Tow Professor of biochemistry and molecular biophysics at Columbia University in New York and a prominent developmental neuroscientist. In 2018, Columbia University announced his termination from his administrative positions after an internal investigation uncovered violations of university policies. He died shortly after from a rapidly neurodegenerative condition diagnosed as progressive supranuclear palsy.

== Education ==
Jessell received his PhD in neuroscience from the University of Cambridge PhD in 1977 with Leslie Iversen at the MRC Neurochemical Pharmacology Unit.

== Career and research ==
After his PhD, he worked as a postdoctoral fellow at Harvard Medical School with Gerald Fischbach. In 1981 he became an assistant professor in the Department of Neurobiology at Harvard Medical School. In 1985 he joined the Columbia University faculty where he worked for the remainder of his career and became Claire Tow Professor of Motor Neuron Disorders (in neuroscience).

Jessell is known for his work on chemical signals that play a role when nerve cells assemble during development to form neuronal circuits. In 1994, he showed that netrin guides commissural axons in the vertebrate spinal cord.

=== Awards ===
In 1994 Jessell was awarded the NAS Award for Scientific Reviewing from the National Academy of Sciences. He was a co-recipient, with Pasko Rakic and Sten Grillner, of the inaugural Kavli Prize for Neuroscience in 2008. He was elected a Fellow of the Royal Society in 1996 and of the Academy of Medical Sciences in 2006. He won the Ralph W. Gerard Prize from the Society for Neuroscience in 2016. He was a fellow of the Norwegian Academy of Science and Letters.

=== Books ===
Jessell was the co-editor, with Eric R. Kandel and James Schwartz, of the well-known textbook Principles of Neural Science.

=== Misconduct investigation and firing ===
On March 7, 2018, Jessell was removed from his post at Columbia University following what a Columbia statement described as "an investigation that revealed serious violations of university policies and values governing the behavior of faculty members in an academic environment". The university did not give details of the nature of the violations. His appointment as an investigator at the Howard Hughes Medical Institute, which he had held since 1985, was also ended. The Columbia Daily Spectator reported on April 12 that Jessell "was engaged in a relationship with a lab member under his supervision for years, violating University policies on consensual romantic and sexual relationships, before being removed from all administrative posts this past March". The newspaper subsequently reported that Jessell "was removed from his administrative post, following an investigation that found him responsible for sexual misconduct". It is reported Jessell was suffering symptoms of an aggressive neurodegenerative disease during this period.
