= Petra Seeger =

German film director

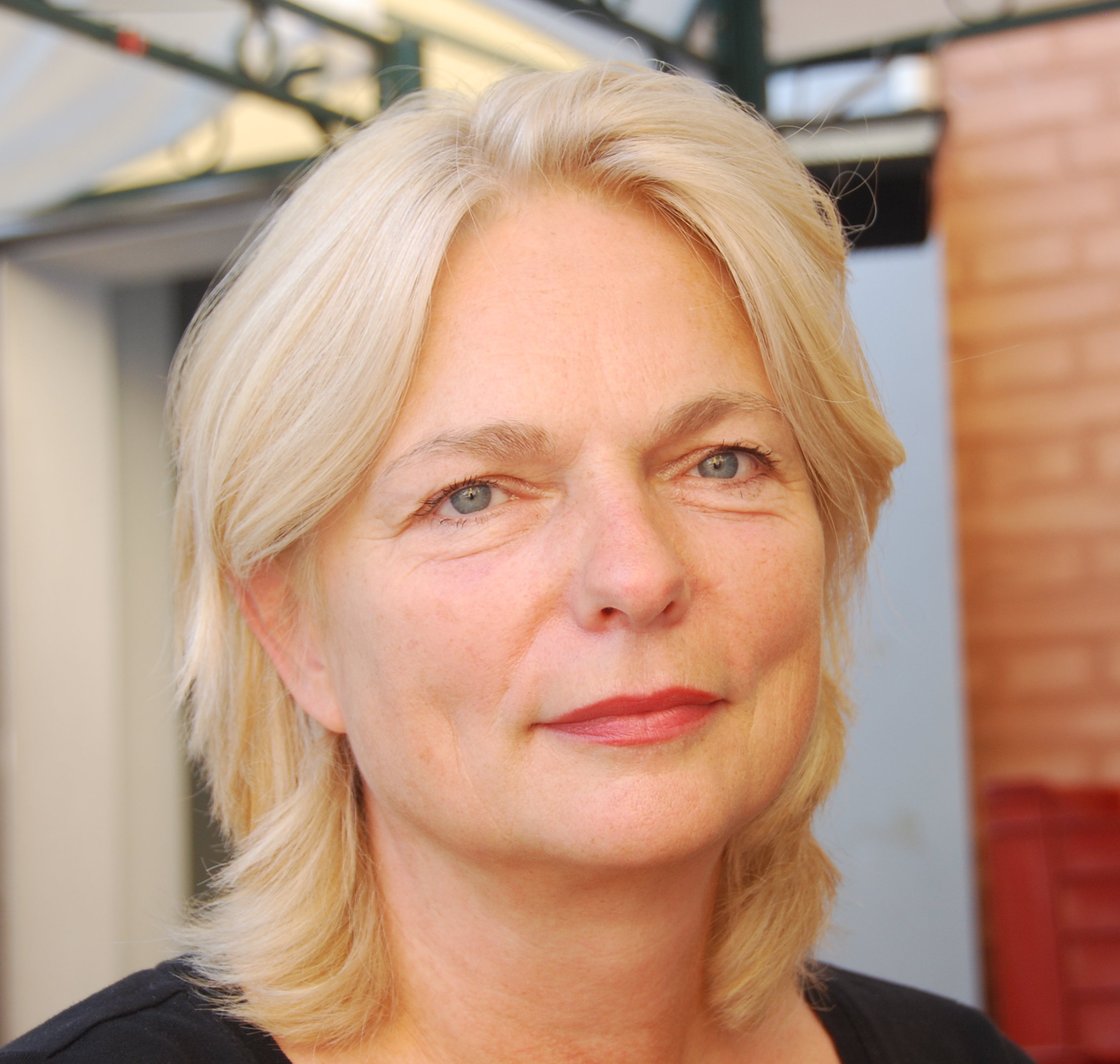
Petra Seeger at the Biografilm Festival in Bologna

Petra Seeger is a German documentary film director and producer. Her 2008 documentary film, In Search of Memory: The Neuroscientist Eric Kandel explores the life of Eric Kandel, a Nobel Prize winning Austrian-born Jewish-American neuroscientist whose research focused on learning and memory.

== Career ==
Seeger has worked as a director since 1979. Creating documentaries for the Westdeutscher Rundfunk, she covered the life of filmmaker Christoph Schlingensief, director Peter Zadek, and filmmaker/playwright Wim Wenders. In 1999, she founded a production company named Petra Seeger Film. Her 2008 documentary film In Search of Memory engages with the life of Nobel Prize winning Austrian neuroscientist Eric Kandel. The film includes interviews with Kandel, his family, and friends, as well as archival footage and recreations of his childhood, and his recollections of witnessing Kristallnacht and his emigration to New York in 1939.

== Critical reception ==
In Search of Memory has been reviewed in Nature, the New York Times, The Boston Globe, Variety, The Christian Science Monitor, The Chicago Reader, and the Chicago Tribune. In Search of Memory received the "Best Documentary" award at the 2010 Bavarian Film Awards. In Search of Memory is included in the permanent collection of the U.S. Holocaust Museum.

== Partial filmography ==
=== Director ===
==== Television ====
- Gsellmanns Augenfutter (1979)
- Der Bund Deutscher Mädel (1980)
- Schule im 3. Reich (1980)
- Turin - Santo Stefano Belbo, film on Cesare Pavese (1984)
- Abschied vom Drehbuch, film on "Zweite Heimat" by Edgar Reitz (1990)
- Ein Film kommt auf die Welt (1992)
- Zwischen allen Stühlen, Christoph Schlingensief makes theater (1993)
- Nikolaikirche Leipzig (1995)
- Peter Zadek inszeniert Mondlicht von Harold Pinter (1996)
- Film is a battleground, film on director Rudolf Thome (1997/1998)
- 380° Afrika (1999)
- Die Schiller-Gang (2000/2001)
- Wim Wenders, BAP und der Oscar (2002)
- Bis zu der großen Ewigkeit (2006)

==== Cinema ====
- In Search of Memory, documentary of Eric Kandel (2008)
- Vatersland (2020)

=== Actress ===
- Gratwanderung (1984)
- Zwei Bilder (1984)

=== Screenplay ===
- Zwei Bilder (1984)
- Vatersland (2003)
