= Denise Kandel =

American medical sociologist and epidemiologist

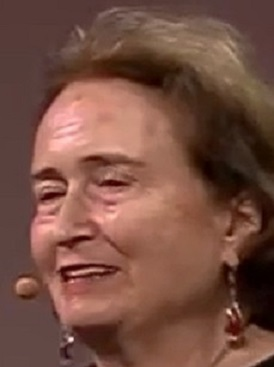
- Born: Denise Bystryn; February 27, 1933 (age 93); Paris, France
- Education: Bryn Mawr College BA; Columbia University MA, PhD
- Known for: Longitudinal studies on the sequence of first-time use of various legal and illegal drugs
- Spouse: Eric Kandel (m. 1956)
- Children: 2
- Scientific career
- Fields: Social medicine, epidemiology
- Workplaces: Sociomedical Sciences and Psychiatry at Columbia University and Department of Epidemiology of Substance Abuse at the New York State Psychiatric Institute

Denise Kandel (German: [ˈkandəl]; née Bystryn; born February 27, 1933) is an American medical sociologist and epidemiologist, Professor of Sociomedical Sciences and Psychiatry at Columbia University and Head of the Department of Epidemiology of Substance Abuse at the New York State Psychiatric Institute. She is known for her epidemiological longitudinal studies on the sequence of first-time use of various legal and illegal drugs, carried out beginning in the 1970s and continuing until at least 2016.

== Life ==
=== Background and family ===
Bystryn was born to Jewish parents who emigrated in the 1920s, before knowing each other, from eastern Poland to France to attend university. Her father Iser Bystryn (1901–1954) studied in Caen and became chief engineer in a truck factory near Paris. Her mother Sara Wolsky Bystryn (1906–2003) had to abandon her plans to study in Paris for financial reasons and learned making hats and corsets. Kandel was born two years after the marriage (1930) of her parents. She had a younger brother, Jean-Claude Bystryn (1938–2010), who became a known American dermatologist and scientist at the NYU Langone Medical Center. Both parents were fluent in French, but spoke Yiddish at home.

=== In France up to 1949 ===
The family lived in Colombes near Paris, and Kandel attended a primary school for girls (Ecole des Filles). The children grew up secularly, the family never went to synagogue, and had presents at Christmas. In 1941, when Kandel was eight, and one year after the German invasion of France during the Second World War, Denise’s father was arrested as a "foreign Jew" and interned 100 km south of Paris in the Nazi Beaune-la-Rolande internment camp. After some time he succeeded in fleeing to Cahors in south-western France, where he could also meet his family again. While the parents – separated from each other – had to change hiding places, the children found more stable shelter. Kandel was able to stay as a pupil in the convent Sainte-Jeanne d'Arc of Cahors until spring 1944, when she had to flee even from there and then lived with a family near Toulouse. In 1949 her family emigrated to the US.

=== In the USA since 1949 ===
Kandel attended the Lycée Français de New York, where she received the Baccalauréat after one year. At the age of 17 she was accepted by Bryn Mawr College near Philadelphia, where she graduated within two years for financial reasons. She then returned to New York to become a PhD student at Columbia University. Her tutor was Robert K. Merton, and she wrote a thesis in medical sociology about how medical students decide on their professional specialization.

During this time she met neuropsychiatrist Eric Kandel, future recipient of the 2000 Nobel Prize in Physiology or Medicine. They married in 1956 and had two children.

== Scientific work ==
When in the 1960s research on drug misuse gained in importance, Kandel applied to join a research team that intended to investigate drug use among high school students. She assumed she could contribute with her research experience concerning the influence of parents and peer groups on adolescents. However, she was rejected, because she wanted to interview both parents and students, and the research team feared that this might undermine students' cooperation. Kandel developed her own research project, which ultimately led to an influential longitudinal study of 1,325 persons. Later, she considered this work as a turning point in her career.

The main subject of this and further investigations was the sequence of first-time use of various legal and illegal drugs. Her research in this area found a strong resonance in scientific and political discussions, and the catchphrases "stepping-stone theory" (used since the 1930s) and "gateway hypothesis" (used since the 1980s) were associated with her name, though often misleadingly. Contrary to many others, Kandel always emphasized the difference between sequence and causation in the first-time use of different substances. These may – but need not – be coupled, a question which is investigated in further research, particularly in physiological experiments.

== Awards ==
- 1985 – National Institutes of Health (NIH): National Institute on Drug Abuse (NIDA): Senior Scientist Research Award (K05)
- 2002 – R. Brinkley Smithers Distinguished Scientist Award
- 2003 – Prevention Science Award
- 2019 – Rema Lapouse Award for Achievement in Epidemiology, Mental Health and Applied Public Health Statistics

== Selected publications ==
=== Original research reports ===
- Kandel, D (1975). "Stages in adolescent involvement in drug use". Science. 190 (4217): 912–914. Bibcode:1975Sci...190..912K. doi:10.1126/science.1188374. hdl:10983/25298. PMID 1188374. S2CID 30124614.
- Yamaguchi, K; Kandel, D. B. (1984). "Patterns of drug use from adolescence to young adulthood: II. Sequences of progression". American Journal of Public Health. 74 (7): 668–672. doi:10.2105/ajph.74.7.668. PMC 1651663. PMID 6742252.
- Kandel, D; Yamaguchi, K (1993). "From beer to crack: Developmental patterns of drug involvement". American Journal of Public Health. 83 (6): 851–855. doi:10.2105/AJPH.83.6.851. PMC 1694748. PMID 8498623.
- Kandel, E. R.; Kandel, D. B. (2014). "Shattuck Lecture. A molecular basis for nicotine as a gateway drug". The New England Journal of Medicine. 371 (10): 932–943. doi:10.1056/NEJMsa1405092. PMC 4353486. PMID 25184865.
- Keyes, K. M.; Hamilton, A; Kandel, D. B. (2016). "Birth Cohorts Analysis of Adolescent Cigarette Smoking and Subsequent Marijuana and Cocaine Use". American Journal of Public Health. 106 (6): 1143–9. doi:10.2105/AJPH.2016.303128. PMC 4880234. PMID 27077359.

=== Books ===
- Denise B Kandel: The career decisions of medical students: a study in occupational recruitment and occupational choice. Dissertation, Columbia University, New York 1960.
- Denise B Kandel, Richard Hays Williams: Psychiatric rehabilitation: some problems of research. New York, Atherton 1964.
- Denise Bystryn Kandel, Gerald S. Lesser: Youth in two worlds. San Francisco, Jossey-Bass 1972, ISBN 978-0-87589-131-6.
- Denise Bystryn Kandel: Longitudinal Research on Drug Use: Empirical Findings and Methodological Issues. Halsted Press 1978, ISBN 978-0-470-26287-0.
- Denise B. Kandel: Parental Influences on Adolescent Marijuana Use And The Baby Boom Generation: Findings from the 1979–1996 National Household Surveys on Drug Abuse. U.S. Government Printing Office 2001, ISBN 978-0-16-050816-5.
- Denise B. Kandel (Ed.): Stages and Pathways of Drug Involvement: Examining the Gateway Hypothesis. Cambridge University Press 2002, ISBN 978-0-521-78969-1.
