= Rose Grundfest Schneider =

American hematologist and geneticist

Rose Grundfest Schneider (July 19, 1908 – October 8, 2003) was an American medical researcher, hematologist, geneticist, and educator known for her work on abnormal hemoglobins, sickle-cell disease, and hemoglobin variants. Associated with the University of Texas Medical Branch (UTMB), she conducted research that contributed to the identification and characterization of numerous hemoglobin variants and to the development of large-scale screening methods for inherited blood disorders.

== Early life and education ==
Rose Grundfest was born in Minsk, Russian Empire, on July 19, 1908. Her parents were Aaron Grundfest and Gertrude Merliss Grundfest. Her family emigrated to the United States in 1913 and settled in Kearny, New Jersey.

She attended Barnard College, receiving a Bachelor of Arts degree in 1929. After working as a laboratory technician at Beth Israel Hospital in New York City, she studied bacteriology and immunology at Radcliffe College and Harvard Medical School. She later earned a Ph.D. in pathology from Cornell Medical College in 1937.

Her brother was Harry Grundfest, a neurophysiologist associated with Columbia University.

== Career and research ==
After earning her doctorate, Schneider lived in Chicago, where her first husband, physician and medical writer Benjamin Frank Miller, held an academic appointment at the University of Chicago. The couple later divorced.

In 1941, she married radiologist Martin Schneider in Dallas, Texas. In 1942 they moved to Galveston, Texas, where Martin Schneider joined the faculty of the University of Texas Medical Branch. Due to anti-nepotism rules then in effect at the university, Rose Schneider was initially unable to hold a formal faculty appointment at the same institution as her husband.

From 1944 to 1945, Schneider served as assistant pathologist at Robert B. Green Hospital in San Antonio. In 1948 she became a research associate at UTMB’s Tissue Culture Laboratory and Tissue Metabolism Research Laboratory, beginning a research program focused on abnormal hemoglobins and inherited blood disorders.

Beginning in the late 1940s, Schneider conducted research on sickle-cell disease and hemoglobinopathies. From 1950 through the late 1970s, her research was supported by grants from the United States Public Health Service. Schneider became known for adapting inexpensive household materials into an electrophoresis apparatus capable of separating abnormal hemoglobins from normal hemoglobins at relatively low cost. Her laboratory analyzed approximately half a million blood samples and contributed to the identification of numerous hemoglobin variants.

According to later institutional accounts, Schneider and her collaborators identified approximately one tenth of the roughly 400 hemoglobin variants known worldwide during her career. In 1958 Schneider and Mary Ellen Haggard reported the identification of Hemoglobin P ("Galveston Type") in Nature. The following year they described another previously unidentified hemoglobin variant in an American Black patient population in The BMJ.

Her later work examined additional hemoglobin variants, including Hemoglobin G-Coushatta, identified in an American Indian family and reported in Science in 1964. Schneider also published research on the interpretation and reliability of sickling tests used in diagnosing sickle-cell disease and related hemoglobinopathies. One of her studies, published in Blood in 1976, analyzed abnormal hemoglobins in approximately 250,000 individuals.

In 1969, Schneider became research professor of pediatrics and professor of human biological chemistry and genetics at UTMB. She served on the World Health Organization Expert Panel on Abnormal Hemoglobins and Thalassemia from 1975 to 1978.

== Public service and advocacy ==
Schneider was active in civic and educational organizations in Galveston, Texas. She served on the founding board of Galveston Community College and later received the institution’s Distinguished Service Award in 1986.

She participated in organizations including the League of Women Voters, the American Association of University Women, and Physicians for Social Responsibility. Schneider also advocated for women in science and for reducing sexism in education and scientific institutions. In 1979 she served on the Texas NOW Continuing Task Force on Education for Women, which evaluated sexism and gender stereotyping in educational materials.

As a member of Physicians for Social Responsibility, Schneider spoke publicly about the dangers of nuclear war and the arms race.

== Honors and recognition ==
In 1973 Schneider became the first woman named Citizen of the Year by the Galveston Chamber of Commerce.

In 1975 she received the John G. Sinclair Award from the UTMB chapter of Sigma Xi for excellence in scientific research.

In 1978 the Texas Division of the American Association of University Women named her Outstanding Woman of the Year.

In 1984 she was inducted into the Galveston Women’s Hall of Fame.

In 1985 the Texas Genetics Society awarded her the Outstanding Contributions in Genetics in Texas Prize.

Following her death, the University of Texas Medical Branch established the Rose Grundfest Schneider, PhD Award in her honor.

== Death ==
Schneider died in Galveston, Texas, on October 8, 2003, at the age of 95.

== Selected publications ==
- Schneider, R. G. (1967). "Sickling Tests: Pitfalls in Performance and Interpretation." JAMA 202 (5): 419.
- Schneider, R. G.; Haggard, M. E. (1959). "A New Haemoglobin Variant in an American Negro." BMJ 2 (5147): 285.
- Schneider, R. G.; Haggard, M. E. (1958). "Hæmoglobin P (the 'Galveston' Type)." Nature 182 (4631): 322–323.
- Schneider, R. G.; Haggard, M. E.; McNutt, C. W.; Johnson, J. E.; Bowman, B. H.; Barnett, D. R. (1964). "Hemoglobin Gcoushatta: A New Variant in an American Indian Family." Science 143 (3607): 697–698.
- Schneider, R.; Hightower, B.; Hosty, T.; Ryder, H.; Tomlin, G.; Atkins, R.; Brimhall, B.; Jones, R. (1976). "Abnormal hemoglobins in a quarter million people." Blood 48 (5): 629–637.

== See also ==
- Harry Grundfest
- Hemoglobinopathy
- Sickle-cell disease
- Hematology
