= Renshaw cell =

Inhibitory interneurons found in the gray matter of the spinal cord

Details
- Neurotransmitter: Glycine

Identifiers
- MeSH: D066293
- NeuroLex ID: nifext_113
- FMA: 86787

Renshaw cells are inhibitory interneurons found in the gray matter of the spinal cord, and are associated in two ways with an alpha motor neuron.

- They receive an excitatory collateral from the alpha neuron's axon as they emerge from the motor root, and are thus "kept informed" of how vigorously that neuron is firing.
- They send an inhibitory axon to synapse with the cell body of the initial alpha neuron and/or an alpha motor neuron of the same motor pool.

In this way, the Renshaw cell action represents a negative feedback mechanism. A Renshaw cell may be supplied by more than one alpha motor neuron collateral and it may synapse on multiple motor neurons.

== Function ==
Although during embryonic development the Renshaw cells lack synapses from the dorsal root, prenatal and postnatal stages show the development of dorsal root–originating synapses, which are functional and stimulate action potentials. But these decrease during development while acetylcholine motor axons begin to synapse and proliferate with Renshaw cells, ultimately being primarily stimulated by the motor neurons.

The Renshaw cells are ultimately excited by multiple antidromic motor neuron axons, where the majority of axons originate from synergist motor neurons, and in turn the Renshaw cell synapses with multiple neurons, eliciting IPSP in alpha motor, 1a inhibitory interneurons and gamma motor neurons. The antidromic collateral circuit back to the triggering motor neuron is known as "recurrent inhibition". This homonymous inhibition is not universal. Whereas most initial experiments have been done on cats, it has been found that in man that proximal muscles of the hand and foot do not have homonymous inhibition. Heteronymous inhibition has been found to be dominant in the leg compared to the arm, where antagonist muscles work simultaneously. (Renshaw cells are activated by gamma motor neurons, but to a lesser extent). The Renshaw cells not only synapse with homonymous and heteronymous nerves, but also with the Ia interneurons, which are stimulated by the Ia afferents from the same muscle group activated by the motor neurons, which have an inhibitory effect on the antagonist muscle group. This "recurrent facilitation" causes reduced inhibition of the reciprocal inhibition of the Ia interneuron of the antagonist group, which may in turn also be inhibited by signals from the corticospinal tract. It has been shown that:

- Recurrent inhibition is depressed during strong voluntary contractions (presumably due to inhibition of the Reshaw cell by descending input).
- Renshaw cells are more inhibited at the same level during a dynamic contraction compared with sustained contraction.
- Renshaw cells are facilitated during weak voluntary contractions.
- Renshaw cells are facilitated during co-activation of antagonists.

The Renshaw cells may also be inhibited by both proprioceptive dorsal root afferents, antidromic ventral axons as well as "descending" inhibition. The hyperpolarization of Renshaw cells by afferent and descending neurons have been shown to be caused by the release of glycine, but GABA may also hyperpolarize the Renshaw cell, for a prolonged time relative to glycine. It has also been shown that glycine is the inhibitory transmitter released by the Renshaw cells.

In essence, the Renshaw cells regulate the firing of the alpha motor neuron leaving the ventral horn. Conceptually they remove "noise" by dampening the firing frequency of over-excited neurons with a negative feedback loop, which prevents weakly excited alpha motor neurons from firing. Descending spinal cord nerves in turn regulate the Renshaw cells.

The rate of discharge of the Renshaw cell is broadly proportional to the rate of discharge of the associated motor neuron(s), and the rate of discharge of the motor neuron(s) is broadly inversely proportional to the rate of discharge of the Renshaw cell(s). Renshaw cells thus act as "limiters," or "governors," on the alpha motor neuron system, thus helping to prevent muscular damage from tetanus.

Renshaw cells utilize the neurotransmitter glycine as an inhibitory substance that synapses on the alpha motor neurons.

== Clinical significance ==
Renshaw cells are also the target of the toxin of Clostridium tetani, a Gram positive, spore-forming anaerobic bacterium that lives in the soil, and causes tetanus. When wounds are contaminated with C. tetani, the toxin travels to the spinal cord where it inhibits the release of glycine, an inhibitory neurotransmitter, from Renshaw cells. As a result, alpha motor neurons become hyperactive, and muscles constantly contract.

Strychnine poison also specifically acts on these cell's ability to control alpha motor neuron firing by binding to the glycine receptors on the alpha motor neuron and thus muscles continually contract and may prove fatal if the diaphragm is involved.

== History ==
The concept of the Renshaw cells was postulated by Birdsey Renshaw (1911–1948), when it was discovered that with antidromic signals from a motor neuron running collaterally back via the ventral root into the spinal cord, there were interneurons firing with a high frequency, resulting in inhibition. Later work by Eccles et al., provided evidence that these interneurons, which they called "Renshaw Cells", are stimulated by acetylcholine from motor neurons (nicotinic receptor). Previous work by Renshaw and Lloyd had shown that this antidromic inhibition resembled direct inhibition from spinal nerves but resulted in relatively longer inhibition of 40–50 ms (compared to 15 ms). The antidromic stimulation of the nerve fiber also resulted in action potentials in the cell bodies of the motor neurons along with hyperpolarization of other groups of motor neurons. In the event where the initial stimulation of the motor neuron originated in a spinal tract, the Renshaw cell spike occurred during the declining phase of the initial motor neuron soma spike, giving an indication of the source and sequence of stimulation of the Renshaw cell.

== See also ==
List of distinct cell types in the adult human body
