= Principles of Neural Science =

Neuroscience textbook

- Cover of fourth edition
- Author: Eric R. Kandel, James H. Schwartz, and Thomas M. Jessell
- Language: English
- Subject: Neuroscience
- Genre: Textbook
- Publisher: McGraw-Hill
- Publication date: 1981 (1st edition); 2021 (6th edition)
- Pages: 468 (1st edition); 1,646 (6th edition)

Principles of Neural Science is a neuroscience textbook edited by Columbia University professors Eric R. Kandel, James H. Schwartz, and Thomas M. Jessell. First published in 1981 by McGraw-Hill, the original edition was 468 pages, and has now grown to 1,646 pages on the sixth edition. The second edition was published in 1985, third in 1991, fourth in 2000. The fifth was published on October 26, 2012 and included Steven A. Siegelbaum and A. J. Hudspeth as editors. The sixth and latest edition was published on March 8, 2021.

== Authors ==
=== Editors ===
- Kandel was one of the recipients of the 2000 Nobel Prize in Physiology or Medicine. He is currently a professor of biochemistry, molecular biophysics, physiology, cellular biophysics, and psychiatry at Columbia University. He is a senior investigator at the Howard Hughes Medical Institute and a recipient of the National Medal of Science.
- Schwartz was a professor of physiology, cellular biophysics, neurology, and psychiatry at Columbia University.
- Jessell became an editor of the book starting from the third edition. He was a professor of biochemistry and molecular biophysics at Columbia University, and an investigator at the Howard Hughes Medical Institute.
- Hudspeth is a professor of sensory neuroscience at Rockefeller University. He is also an investigator at the Howard Hughes Medical Institute.
- Siegelbaum is Chair of the Department of Neuroscience at Columbia University and is also an investigator at the Howard Hughes Medical Institute.

=== Contributors ===
Including the editors—all of whom also contributed to individual chapters in the book—there are a total of 45 authors of this text. Included among them are several notable researchers and physicians. Several authors are also highly decorated scientists, including Nobel laureate Linda B. Buck and renowned neurophysiologist Roger M. Enoka.

== Content ==
Principles of Neural Science is often assigned as a textbook for many undergraduate and graduate/medical neuroscience and neurobiology courses. The book attempts to introduce every aspect of the most modern understanding of the brain. The sixth edition is divided into sixty-four chapters, organized into nine parts:

- Part I: Overall Perspective
- Part II: Cell and Molecular Biology of Cells of the Nervous System
- Part III: Synaptic Transmission
- Part IV: Perception
- Part V: Movement
- Part VI: The Biology of Emotion, Motivation, and Homeostasis
- Part VII: Development and the Emergence of Behavior
- Part VIII: Learning, Memory, Language and Cognition
- Part IX: Diseases of the Nervous System

== Sources ==
- Kandel ER, Schwartz JH, Jessell TM 1991. Principles of Neural Science, 3rd ed. Appleton & Lange. ISBN 0-8385-8068-8
- Kandel ER, Schwartz JH, Jessell TM 2000. Principles of Neural Science, 4th ed. McGraw-Hill, New York. ISBN 0-8385-7701-6
- Kandel ER, Schwartz JH, Jessell TM 2012, Siegelbaum SA, Hudspeth AJ. Principles of Neural Science, 5th ed. McGraw-Hill, New York. ISBN 0-07-139011-1
- Kandel ER, Koester JD, Mack SH 2021, Siegelbaum SA. Principles of Neural Science, 6th ed. McGraw-Hill, New York. ISBN 978-1-25-964224-1
