= James H. Schwartz (neurobiologist) =

American neurobiologist

James H. Schwartz (20 April 1932–13 March 2006) was an American neurobiologist and professor at Columbia University in New York City. He was a co-editor, with Eric R. Kandel and Thomas Jessell, of the well-known textbook Principles of Neural Science. His research focused on explaining the biochemical basis of learning and memory and focused on the origins of learning and animal behaviors at the cellular and molecular level.

He died at age 73 from complications related to leukemia.
