= Ephaptic coupling =

Form of nervous system communication

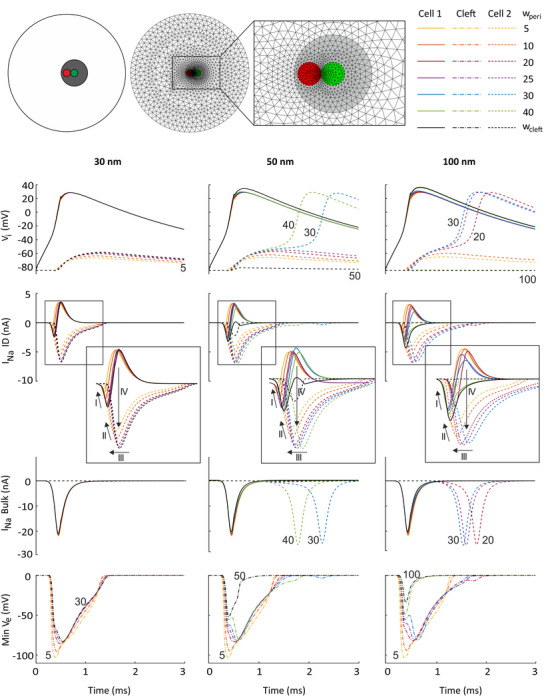
- Perinexial (around the axis) ephaptic coupling

Ephaptic coupling is a form of communication within the nervous system that is distinct from direct communication systems like electrical synapses and chemical synapses. The phrase may refer to the coupling of adjacent (touching) nerve fibers caused by the exchange of ions between the cells, or it may refer to coupling of nerve fibers as a result of local electric fields. In either case, ephaptic coupling can influence the synchronization and timing of action potential firing in neurons. Research suggests that myelination may inhibit ephaptic interactions.

== History and etymology ==
The idea that the electrical activity generated by nervous tissue may influence the activity of surrounding nervous tissue is one that dates back to the late 19th century. Early experiments, like those by Emil du Bois-Reymond, demonstrated that the firing of a primary nerve may induce the firing of an adjacent secondary nerve (termed "secondary excitation"). This effect was not quantitatively explored, however, until experiments by Katz and Schmitt in 1940, when the two explored the electric interaction of two adjacent limb nerves of the crab Carcinus maenas. Their work demonstrated that the progression of the action potential in the active axon caused excitability changes in the inactive axon. These changes were attributed to the local currents that form the action potential. For example, the currents that caused the depolarization (excitation) of the active nerve caused a corresponding hyperpolarization (depression) of the adjacent resting fiber. Similarly, the currents that caused repolarization of the active nerve caused slight depolarization in the resting fiber. Katz and Schmitt also observed that stimulation of both nerves could cause interference effects. Simultaneous action potential firing caused interference and resulted in decreased conduction velocity, while slightly offset stimulation resulted in synchronization of the two impulses.

In 1941, Angélique Arvanitaki explored the same topic and proposed the usage of the term "ephapse" (from the Greek ephapsis and meaning "to touch") to describe this phenomenon and distinguish it from synaptic transmission. Over time, the term ephaptic coupling has come to be used not only in cases of electric interaction between adjacent elements, but also more generally to describe the effects induced by any field changes along the cell membrane.

== Mechanism and effects ==
=== Role in excitation and inhibition ===
The early work performed by Katz and Schmitt demonstrated that ephaptic coupling between the two adjacent nerves was insufficient to stimulate an action potential in the resting nerve. Under ideal conditions the maximum depolarization observed was approximately 20% of the threshold stimulus. However, conditions can be manipulated in such a way that the action potential from one neuron can be spread to a neighboring neuron. This was accomplished in one study in two experimental conditions:

- Increased calcium concentrations, which lowered the threshold potential, or
- By submerging the axons in mineral oil, which increased resistance.

While these manipulations do not reflect normal conditions, they do highlight the mechanisms behind ephaptic excitation.

Ephaptic coupling has also been found to play an important role in inhibition of neighboring neurons. Depending on the location and identity of the neurons, various mechanisms have been found to underlie ephaptic inhibition. In one study, newly excited neighboring neurons interfered with already sustained currents, thus lowering the extracellular potential and depolarizing the neuron in relation to its surrounding environment, effectively inhibiting the action potential's propagation.

=== Role in synchronization and timing ===
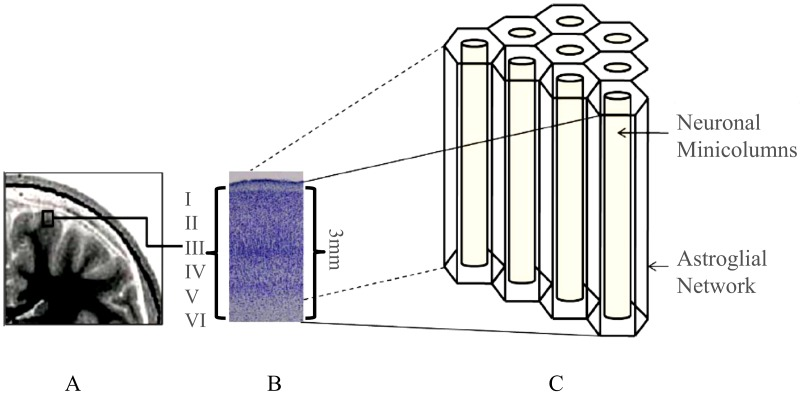
Three-dimensional (3D) organization of the human neocortex.

Studies of ephaptic coupling have also focused on its role in the synchronization and timing of action potentials in neurons. In the simpler case of adjacent fibers that experience simultaneous stimulation, the impulse is slowed because both fibers are limited to exchange ions solely with the interstitial fluid (increasing the resistance of the nerve). Slightly offset impulses (conduction velocities differing by less than 10%) are able to exchange ions constructively, and the action potentials propagate slightly out of phase at the same velocity.

More recent research, however, has focused on the more general case of electric fields that affect a variety of neurons. It has been observed that local field potentials in cortical neurons can serve to synchronize neuronal activity. Although the mechanism is unknown, it is hypothesized that neurons are ephaptically coupled to the frequencies of the local field potential. This coupling may effectively synchronize neurons into periods of enhanced excitability (or depression) and allow for specific patterns of action potential timing (often referred to as spike timing). This effect has been demonstrated and modeled in a variety of cases.

A hypothesis or explanation behind the mechanism is "one-way", "master-slave", or "unidirectional synchronization" effect as mathematical and fundamental property of non-linear dynamic systems (oscillators like neurons) to synchronize under certain criteria. Such phenomenon was proposed and predicted to be possible between two HR neurons, since 2010, in simulations and modeling work by Hrg. It was also shown that such unidirectional synchronization or copy/paste transfer of neural dynamics from master to slave neurons, could be exhibited in different ways. Hence the phenomenon is of not only fundamental interest but also applied one from treating epilepsy to novel learning systems. A study in July 2023 found that mathematical models of ephaptic coupling predicted in vivo data of neural activity. The authors likened the electric field to a conductor of an orchestra and neurons to the musicians. Then the field, like the conductor, listens to the music and guides the musicians accordingly. In an opinion paper, they also suggested that not only neurons but other parts of the cytoskeleton generate electromagnetic fields that influence individual neurons, and called this cytoelectric coupling. Synchronization of neurons is in principle unwanted behavior, as brain would have zero information or be simply a bulb if all neurons would synchronize. Hence it is a hypothesis that neurobiology and evolution of brain coped with ways of preventing such synchronous behavior on large scale, using it rather in other special cases.

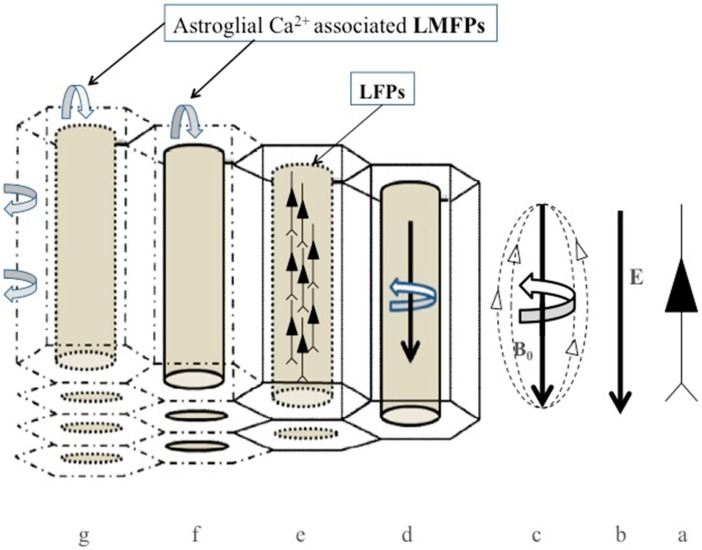
Schematic representation of the bioelectromagnetic field distribution in the neocortex and gliocortex.

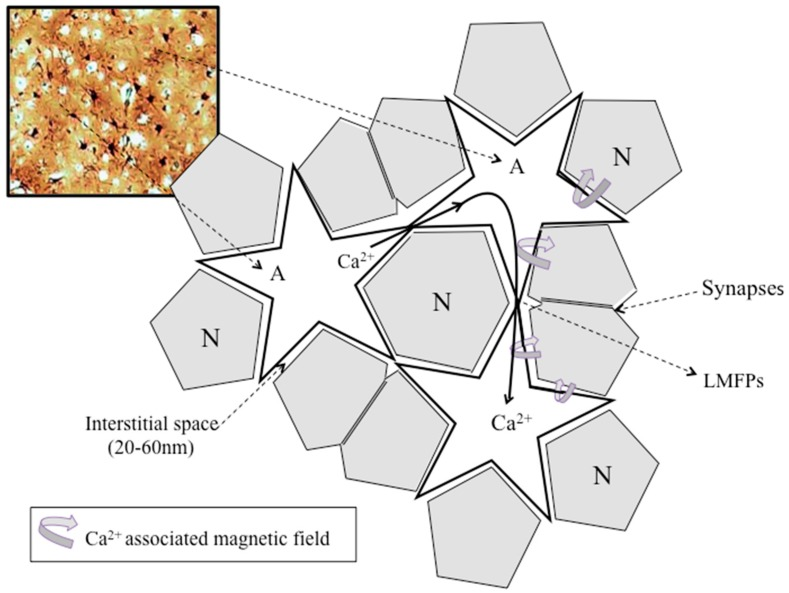
Schematic representation of neurons (N) and astrocytes (A) in layer 2–3 of the human neocortex.

As models of brain function using only neuronal and gap junction connections fail to explain its complexity, ephaptic coupling is being added more to the equation to try and explain the isopotentiality of cortical astrocytes to maintain the bioelectromagnetic crosstalk between neurons and astrocytes in the neocortex.

== Examples ==
=== Cardiac tissue ===
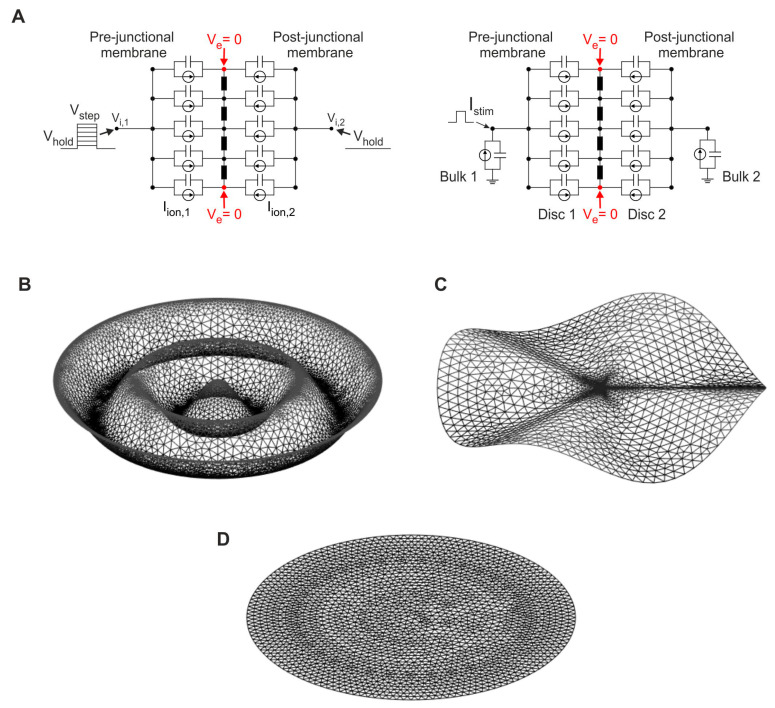
Different finite element geometries and meshes for muscle intercalated discs.

The electrical conduction system of the heart has been robustly established. However, newer research has been challenging some of the previously accepted models. The role of ephaptic coupling in cardiac cells is becoming more apparent. One author even goes so far as to say:

While previously viewed as a possible alternative to electrotonic coupling, ephaptic coupling has since come to be viewed as operating in tandem with gap junctions, helping sustain conduction when gap junctional coupling is compromised.

Ephaptic interactions among cardiac cells help fill in the gaps that electrical synapses alone cannot account for. The proximity of sodium channels to gap junction plaques has been shown to relate to their effectiveness in driving ephaptic coupling action potential transmission. There are also a number of mathematical models that now incorporate ephaptic coupling into predictions about electrical conductance in the heart. Experimental work suggests that sodium channel-rich nanodomains located at sites of close contact between cardiac myocytes may constitute functional units of ephaptic coupling and selective disruption of these nanodomains resulted in arrhythmogenic conduction slowing, suggesting an important role for ephaptic coupling in the heart. Potential ephaptic connections are now being considered in heart therapeutics.

=== Epilepsy and seizures ===
Epileptic seizures occur when there is synchrony of electrical waves in the brain. Knowing the role that ephaptic coupling plays in maintaining synchrony in electrical signals, it makes sense to look for ephaptic mechanisms in this type of pathology. One study suggested that cortical cells represent an ideal place to observe ephaptic coupling due to the tight packing of axons, which allows for interactions between their electrical fields. They tested the effects of changing extracellular space (which affects local electrical fields) and found that one can block epileptic synchronization independent of chemical synapse manipulation simply by increasing the space between cells. Later, a model was created to predict this phenomenon and showed scenarios with greater extracellular spacing that effectively blocked epileptic synchronization in the brain.

=== Olfactory system in the brain ===
Neurons in the olfactory system are unmyelinated and densely packed and thus the often small effects of ephaptic coupling are more easily seen. A number of studies have shown how inhibition among neurons in the olfactory system works to fine-tune integration of signals in response to odor. This inhibition has been shown to occur from changes in electrical potentials alone. The addition of ephaptic coupling to olfactory neuron models adds further support to the "dedicated-line" model in which each olfactory receptor sends its signal to one neuron. The inhibition due to ephaptic coupling would help account for the integration of signals that gives rise to more nuanced perception of smells.

=== Synapses ===
Synapses are typically formed where two neurons come in very close proximity. Ephaptic coupling may therefore arise across the synaptic cleft. Prominent examples are the fish Mauthner cell, the chick ciliary ganglion, the mammalian cerebellar basket synapse, and the mammalian, developing calyx of Held synapse.

== Mathematical models ==
Due to the very small electrical fields produced by neurons, mathematical models are often used in order to test a number of manipulations. Cable theory is one of the most important mathematical theories in neuroscience. It calculates electric current using capacitance and resistance as variables and has been the main basis for many predictions about ephaptic coupling in neurons. However, many authors have worked to create more refined models in order to more accurately represent the environments of the nervous system. For example, many authors have proposed models for cardiac tissue that includes additional variables that account for the unique structure and geometry of cardiac cells, varying scales of size, or three-dimensional electrodiffusion.

Computational models of ephaptic coupling in white matter based on cable theoretic principles have suggested that ephaptic interactions may sculpt the synchrony and timing of spikes traveling along axonal fiber bundles in the brain, which may be related to "pink noise" or the log-linear 1/f power spectrum observed in numerous measures of brain activity

== Animal models ==
=== Squid giant axons ===
In 1978, basic tests were being conducted on squid giant axons in order to find evidence of ephaptic events. It was shown that an action potential of one axon could be propagated to a neighboring axon. The level of transmission varied, from subthreshold changes to initiation of an action potential in a neighboring cell, but in all cases, it was apparent that there are implications of ephaptic coupling that are of physiological importance.

=== Rat spinal cord and medulla ===
One study tested the effects of ephaptic coupling by using both neurotransmitter antagonists to block chemical synapses and gap junction blockers to block electrical synapses. It was found that rhythmic electrical discharge associated with fetal neurons in the rat spinal cord and medulla was still sustained. This suggests that connections between the neurons still exist and work to spread signals even without traditional synapses. These findings support a model in which ephaptic coupling works alongside canonical synapses to propagate signals across neuronal networks.

=== Rat Purkinje cells of the cerebellum ===
One of the few known cases of a functional system in which ephaptic coupling is responsible for an observable physiological event is in the Purkinje cells of the rat cerebellum. It was demonstrated in this study that the basket cells which encapsulate some regions of Purkinje fibers can cause inhibitory effects on the Purkinje cells. The firing of these basket cells, which occurs more rapidly than in the Purkinje cells, draws current across the Purkinje cell and generates a passive hyperpolarizing potential which inhibits the activity of the Purkinje cell. Although the exact functional role of this inhibition is still unclear, it may well have a synchronizing effect in the Purkinje cells as the ephaptic effect will limit the firing time.

A similar ephaptic effect has been studied in the Mauthner cells of teleosts.

== Skepticism ==
While the idea of non-synaptic interactions between neurons has existed since the 19th century, there has historically been considerable skepticism in the field of neuroscience. Many people believed that the micro electrical fields produced by the neurons themselves were so small that they were negligible. While many supporters of the ephaptic coupling theory have been trying to prove its existence through experiments that block both chemical and electrical synapses, still some opponents in the field express caution. For example, in 2014, one scientist published a review that presents his skepticism on the idea of ephaptic coupling, saying "The agreement between their simulations and Poelzing's data is impressive, but I will need a more definitive experimental confirmation before I can embrace the ephaptic hypothesis." He bases his caution in wanting more distinction between gap junctions' propagation of charge and true ephaptic coupling. Whether it is a true lack of evidence or simply obstinance in the face of change, many in the field are still not entirely convinced there is unambiguous evidence of ephaptic coupling.

Research continues, and, in 2018, what appears to be a definitive experiment was published. A process of slow wave propagation in the brain of about 0.1m per second has been shown in vivo. Slow wave propagation was also recorded by inserting two electrodes into two ends of a piece of mouse brain taken from a freshly killed mouse. The tissue was then cut between the two electrode positions, severing any possible link by neurons or gap junctions between the two electrodes. The slow wave continued to propagate and could only be stopped by separating the two pieces of tissue with a 400-micron gap. Assuming the reproducibility of this experiment skeptics of ephaptic coupling should be satisfied it is a real phenomenon and investigations will focus now on its mechanisms and role rather than its existence.

== See also ==
- Saltatory conduction
- Electroencephalography
- Spike-field coherence
- NeuroElectroDynamics
- Cable theory
- Local field potential
