= Thomas J. Carew =

American neuroscientist

Thomas J. Carew, born July 25, 1944 in Los Angeles, California, dean of the Faculty of Arts and Sciences at New York University, is an American neuroscientist whose interests center on the behavioral, cellular, and molecular analyses of learning and memory. His work provides empirical support for the idea that different temporal phases of memory consolidation can be best identified not by their different temporal domains, but by their molecular signatures.

== Education ==
Carew obtained his Ph.D. from the University of California, Riverside in 1970.

== Career ==
He then joined the laboratory of Eric Kandel as a postdoctoral fellow at the New York University School of Medicine. In 1974, he moved with the group to Columbia University’s College of Physicians and Surgeons, where he became a faculty member in the Department of Psychiatry. In 1983, he moved to Yale University as the John M. Musser Professor of Psychology and Professor of Molecular, Cellular, and Developmental Biology. He served as chair of the Department of Psychology for six years.

In 2000, Carew became the Bren Professor and chair of the Department of Neurobiology and Behavior at the University of California, Irvine. In 2011, he became the dean of the Faculty of Arts and Science and a member of the Center for Neural Science at New York University.

== Research ==
Early in his career, in collaboration with Eric Kandel and colleagues, Carew provided the first evidence in Aplysia californica—the California sea slug—for both long-term memory and associative learning in this model system. Carew subsequently developed four lines of research that provide mechanistic insights into learning and memory.

First, he was able to dissociate several different types of memory on both behavioral and synaptic levels, showing, for example, in contrast to a prevailing theoretical view, that it is possible to induce both intermediate-term and long-term synaptic changes underlying memory in the absence of short-term changes. Second, he developed experimental methods which permit independent analysis of somatic and synaptic compartments of identified neurons in the central nervous system (CNS) that are involved in memory formation showing, for instance, that local protein synthesis at the synapse is essential for the induction of intermediate-term memory. Third, he has identified three mechanistically distinct phases of synaptic facilitation in the CNS, each of which predicted the existence and molecular features of distinct temporal phases of behavioral memory. Finally, in more recent work, he has identified the contribution of a number of specific molecular cascades, as well as their interactions, in the induction and consolidation of different forms of memory.

Carew's research contributions all connect specific synaptic and molecular events to bona fide instances of memory expressed behaviorally.

== Honors ==
Carew is the recipient of a National Institute of Mental Health (NIMH) MERIT Award, an NIMH Career Development Award, Yale's Dylan Hixon Prize for Excellence in Teaching in the Natural Sciences, and the Outstanding Faculty Mentor Award at the University of California, Irvine.

He is an elected Fellow of the American Association for the Advancement of Science and was chair of its Neuroscience Section; he was president of the Society for Neuroscience; he is an elected Fellow of Division 6 of the American Psychological Association (APA) and an APA Distinguished Scientist Lecturer.
