= Kelsey Martin =

American professor

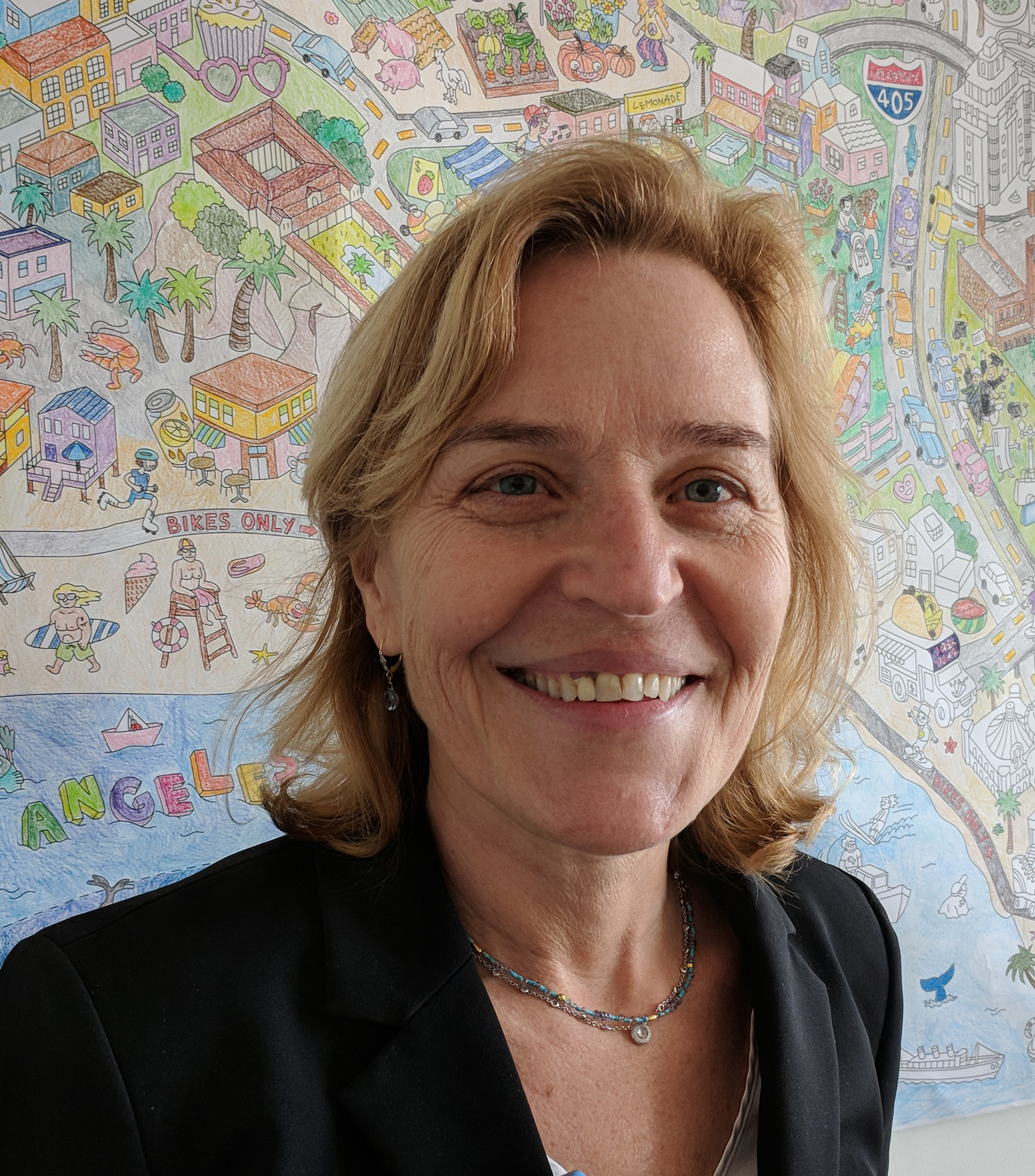
- Kelsey Martin at UCLA in 2018
- Citizenship: United States
- Education: Harvard University (B.A.); Yale University (M.D., Ph.D.)
- Known for: neuronal plasticity in learning and memory
- Awards: American Academy of Arts and Sciences (2016); National Academy of Medicine (2016); National Academy of Sciences (2024); Kavli Prize (2026)
- Scientific career
- Fields: Neuroscience
- Institutions: UCLA
- Doctoral advisor: Ari Helenius
- Other academic advisors: Eric Kandel
- Website: https://martinlab.healthsciences.ucla.edu/

Kelsey Martin is professor emeritus of biological chemistry, psychiatry and biobehavioral sciences at the University of California, Los Angeles (UCLA) and the executive vice president of the Simons Foundation Autism Research Initiative (SFARI) and the Simons Foundation Neuroscience Collaborations. She was the former dean of David Geffen School of Medicine at UCLA from 2015 to 2021. She was the first woman to be named dean of the UCLA medical school and one of just a few female medical school deans in the United States. In 2026, she was elected to the American Philosophical Society.

== Education and career ==
Martin majored in English and American Language and Literature at Harvard University, earning her B.A. cum laude in 1979. She spent two years volunteering with the Peace Corps in Zaire before resuming her post-graduate education. Martin returned to the United States and obtained her M.D./Ph.D. from Yale University in 1992. Her graduate thesis work investigated the nuclear transport of influenza virus ribonucleoproteins in the laboratory of Ari Helenius. She went on to postdoctoral training with Eric Kandel at the Center for Neurobiology and Behavior at Columbia University. At Columbia University, she made the seminal discovery that a single axonal branch can be the substrate for synaptic plasticity associated with learning and memory.

== Research ==
Martin's research focuses on the cell biology of synaptic plasticity, the process by which neurons change the strength of their connections with experience to form memories. She has identified soluble synaptic signaling molecules and transcriptional regulators that undergo stimulus-induced synapse to nucleus transport and discovered a role for the local translation of synaptically, localized mRNAs during synapse-specific forms of plasticity. She has also elucidated cell biological mechanisms underlying the transport of transcripts from soma to the synapse as well as mechanisms underlying their local, activity-dependent translation.

== Honors ==
In 2016, Martin was elected to the American Academy of Arts and Sciences.

In 2016, Martin was elected to the National Academy of Medicine.

In 2024, Martin was elected to the National Academy of Sciences.

In 2026, she was awarded the Kavli Prize in the category of "Neurosciences".

== Personal life ==
Martin is the daughter of the late George Martin, professor of pathology emeritus at the University of Washington and a prominent researcher in the study of human aging. Her husband, Joel Braslow, is an M.D.-Ph.D. psychiatrist-historian at Columbia University. The couple has four children.
