= Pittinger =

Pittinger is a surname. Notable people with the surname include:

- Otto Pittinger (1878–1926), Bavarian medical officer, soldier and politician
- Togie Pittinger (1872–1909), American baseball player
- William Pittenger, misspelt as William Pittinger by many sources

== See also ==
- Pittenger (surname)
