= Scott A. Small =

American neurologist and neuroscientist

- Education: New York University (BA); Columbia University (MD)
- Scientific career
- Fields: Neurobiology of Disease
- Workplaces: Columbia University
- Doctoral advisor: Eric Kandel

Scott A. Small is an American neurologist and neuroscientist known for his work in Alzheimer's disease and normal cognitive aging. His research focuses on the hippocampus, a circuit in the brain targeted by Alzheimer's disease, aging, and schizophrenia. Small is the Director of the Alzheimer's Disease Research Center at Columbia University, where he is the Boris and Rose Katz Professor of Neurology. He is also appointed in Radiology and in Psychiatry.

== Work ==
Small has developed high-resolution functional MRI applications that can pinpoint the areas of the hippocampus most affected by aging and disease. His lab uses this 'anatomical biology' approach of isolating pathogenic mechanisms to identify potential causes of these disorders and inform on drug discovery and development. To date, these mechanistic insights have led to the testing of therapeutic interventions for three hippocampal-based conditions: retromer-enhancers for Alzheimer's disease; dietary flavanols for cognitive aging; and glutamate-reducers for schizophrenia.

Small has authored more than 140 papers and is an inventor of 10 patents. In 2021 he published the book Forgetting: The Benefits of Not Remembering, in which he argues that normal, everyday forgetfulness is not a brain failure or a glitch, but rather an active, necessary cognitive gift.
