= Christopher Pittenger =

American psychiatrist

- Born: 1972 (age 53–54); Baltimore, Maryland, US

Academic background
- Education: BSc, 1994, Yale University; PhD, 2002, Columbia University; MD, 2003, Columbia University Vagelos College of Physicians and Surgeons
- Thesis: A shared role for CREB in declarative and procedural memory (2002)
- Doctoral advisor: Eric Kandel

Christopher J. Pittenger (born 1972) is an American psychiatrist and translational neuroscientist. He is a professor of psychiatry at the Yale School of Medicine and Director of the Yale OCD Research Clinic.

== Early life and education ==
Pittenger was born in 1972 in Baltimore, Maryland, to parents Judy MacGillivray and Arthur Pittenger. Growing up, he was a choirboy at St. Davids Episcopal Church and attended Friends School of Baltimore. Pittenger completed his Bachelor of Science degree in 1994 from Yale University and his PhD in 2002 from Columbia University. During college, Pittenger discovered that "neurobiology was an ideal way to synthesize his interests in molecular biology and human psychology." While completing his doctorate under the guidance of Eric Kandel, he accidentally altered the striatum in mice, instead of altering the hippocampus. Pittenger then worked towards his medical degree, which he earned in 2003 at Columbia University Vagelos College of Physicians and Surgeons, and his residency in Adult Psychiatry in 2007.

== Career ==
Upon completing his residency, Pittenger joined the faculty at the Yale School of Medicine as an assistant professor of psychiatry and Director of the Yale OCD Research Clinic. While serving in this role, he was the co-recipient of the 2009 Society for Neuroscience's Career Development Award to investigate the biological mechanisms of Tourette syndrome. In 2010, Yale researchers identified a histidine decarboxylase, a gene mutation that causes Tourette syndrome, in a family with nine members who shared both the mutation and the disorder. As a result, Pittenger received a Yale Center for Clinical Investigation (YCCI) pilot award in 2011 to create a mouse model of the disease in order to better understand its cause. Two years later, Pittenger was promoted to the rank of associate professor in the Department of Psychiatry.

Upon being promoted to associate professor, Pittenger led a study suggesting that existing drugs that target histamine receptors in the brain would be useful in treating Tourette's. In 2015, Pittenger was awarded the Eva King Killam Research Award from the American College of Neuropsychopharmacology.

In 2018, Pittenger was elected to serve as Yale's vice chair of the Faculty Advisory Council and Assistant Chair for Translational Research. During the COVID-19 pandemic, Pittenger was named the Director of the Clinical Neuroscience Research Unit and of the Neuroscience Research Training Program at the Connecticut Mental Health Center. He was also part of a research team that proposed a possible cause for the sudden onset of obsessive-compulsive disorder in some children. Later, in April 2021, he was elected a fellow of the American Society for Clinical Investigation.

== Selected publications ==
- Obsessive-Compulsive Disorder: Phenomenology, Pathophysiology, and Treatment (2017)
