= Ladislav Tauc =

French neuroscientist

- Born: 28 May 1926; Pardubice, Czechoslovakia
- Died: 2 June 1999 (aged 73); Orsay, France
- Scientific career
- Fields: neuroscience
- Workplaces: Institut Marey; French National Centre for Scientific Research

Ladislav Tauc (1926–1999) was a French neuroscientist, born in Pardubice, Czechoslovakia.

He was a pioneer in neuroethology and neuronal physiology, who immigrated to France in 1949 to work at the Institut Marey in Paris. Tauc was the founder and former director of the Laboratoire de Neurobiologie Cellulaire et Moléculaire of the French National Centre for Scientific Research (CNRS). Eric R. Kandel spent a year studying in Paris with Tauc. It was in Paris that Kandel started to investigate the gill withdrawal reflex and postsynaptic potentials (PSP) in identified neurons in the abdominal ganglion of Aplysia.

"The introduction of a 'simplified' brain (the Aplysia nervous system) to study the cellular and molecular basis of organized neuronal interactions, has been described as one of Tauc's essential contributions to neuroscience."

Since the year 2000 an annual meeting is organized in honor of Ladislav Tauc.

== See also ==
- Eric R. Kandel
- Torsten Wiesel
- Stephen Kuffler
