= Eric Kandel =

American neuropsychiatrist

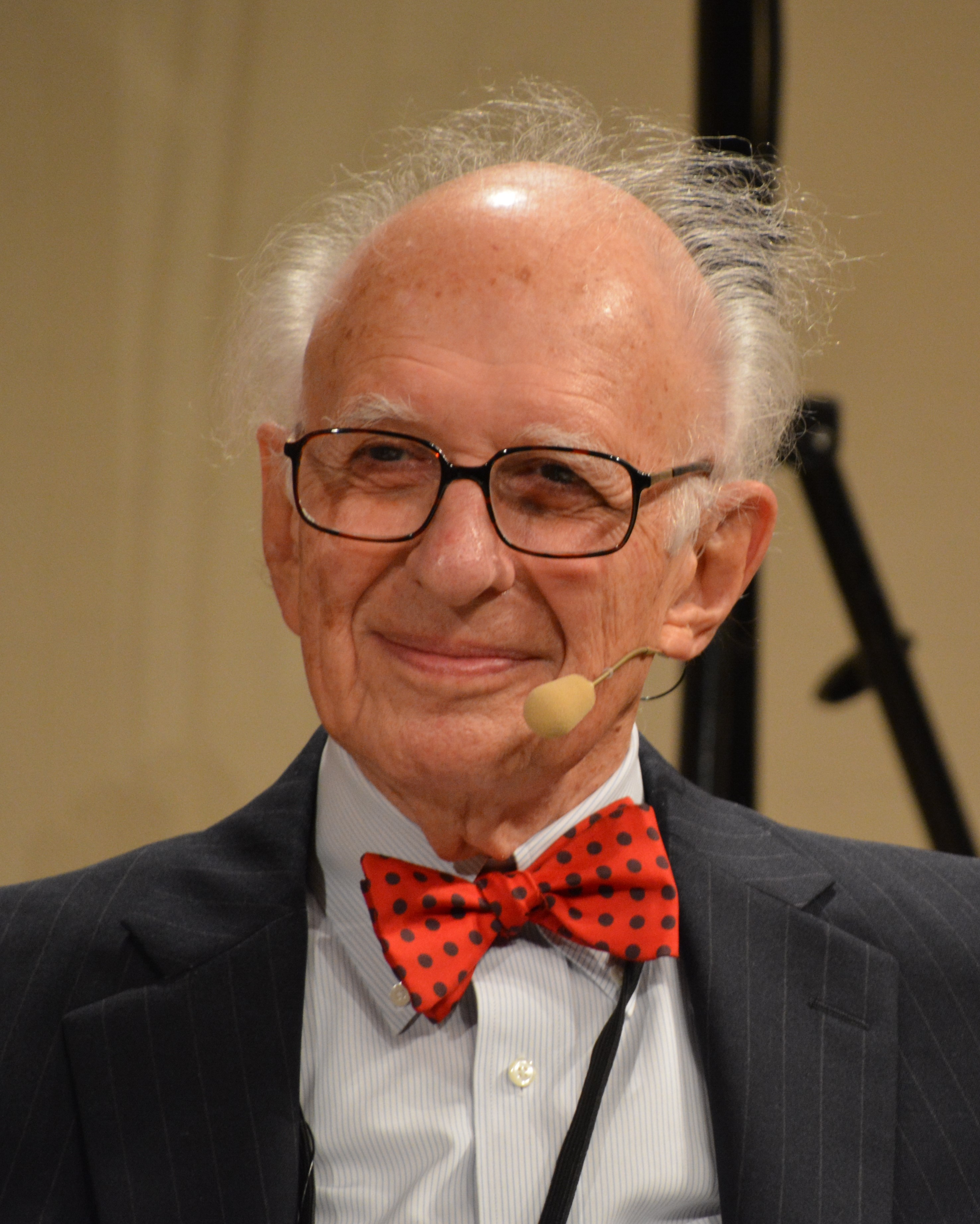
- Kandel in 2013
- Born: Erich Richard Kandel; November 7, 1929 (age 96); Vienna, Austria
- Education: Harvard University (BA); New York University (MD)
- Known for: Physiology of learning and memory
- Spouse: Denise Bystryn (m. 1956)
- Children: 2
- Awards: Karl Spencer Lashley Award (1981); Dickson Prize (1983); Lasker Award (1983); National Medal of GSS (1988); Harvey Prize (1993); Wolf Prize in Medicine (1999); Nobel Prize in Physiology or Medicine (2000)
- Scientific career
- Fields: Psychiatry, psychoanalysis and neuroscience
- Workplaces: Columbia University College of Physicians and Surgeons
- Notable students: James H Schwartz; Tom Carew; Kelsey C. Martin; Priya Rajasethupathy; Scott A. Small; Christopher Pittenger

Eric Richard Kandel (German: [ˈkandəl]; born Erich Richard Kandel, November 7, 1929) is an Austrian-born American medical doctor who specialized in psychiatry. He was also a neuroscientist and a professor of biochemistry and biophysics at the College of Physicians and Surgeons at Columbia University. He was a recipient of the 2000 Nobel Prize in Physiology or Medicine for his research on the physiological basis of memory storage in neurons. He shared the prize with Arvid Carlsson and Paul Greengard.

Kandel was from 1984 to 2022 a senior investigator in the Howard Hughes Medical Institute. He was in 1975 the founding director of the Center for Neurobiology and Behavior, which is now the Department of Neuroscience at Columbia University. He currently serves on the Scientific Council of the Brain & Behavior Research Foundation.

Kandel's popularized account chronicling his life and research, In Search of Memory: The Emergence of a New Science of Mind, was awarded the 2006 Los Angeles Times Book Prize for Science and Technology.

== Early years ==
Eric's mother, Charlotte Zimels, was born in 1897 in Kolomyia, Pokuttya (modern Ukraine). She came from an Ashkenazi Jewish family. At that time Kolomyya was part of Austria-Hungary. His father, Hermann Kandel, was born in 1898 in Olesko, Galicia (then part of Austria-Hungary). At the beginning of World War I, his parents moved to Vienna, Austria, where they met and married in 1923.

Eric Kandel was born on November 7, 1929, in Vienna. Shortly after, his father established a toy store. Although thoroughly assimilated and acculturated, the family sensed the Nazi danger and, unlike others, left Austria after the country had been annexed by Germany in March 1938 at great expense. As a result of the Anschluss, attacks on Jews had escalated and Jewish property was being confiscated. When Kandel was 9, he and his brother Ludwig, 14, boarded the Gerolstein at Antwerp, Belgium, and joined their uncle in Brooklyn on May 11, 1939, to be followed later by his parents.

After arriving in the United States and settling in Brooklyn, Kandel was tutored by his grandfather in Judaic studies and was accepted at the Yeshiva of Flatbush, from which he graduated in 1944. He attended Brooklyn's Erasmus Hall High School in the New York City school system.

Kandel's undergraduate major at Harvard was History and Literature. He wrote an undergraduate honors thesis on "The Attitude Toward National Socialism of Three German Writers: Carl Zuckmayer, Hans Carossa, and Ernst Jünger". While at Harvard, a place where psychology was dominated by the work of B. F. Skinner, Kandel became interested in learning and memory. However, while Skinner championed a strict separation of psychology, as its own level of discourse, from biological considerations such as neurology, Kandel's work is essentially centered on an explanation of the relationships between psychology and neurology.

The world of neuroscience was opened up to Kandel as a consequence of his favorite literature teacher at the time, Karl Viëtor's, sudden death in 1951 and leaving Kandel's next term schedule at Harvard, besides feeling "deep personal loss" over Viëtor's death, unexpectedly empty. Around that time Kandel had met Anna Kris, whose parents Ernst Kris and Marianne Rie were psychoanalysts from Sigmund Freud's Vienna-based circle. Freud was a pioneer in revealing the importance of unconscious neural processes, and his lines of thought are at the root of Kandel's interest in the biology of motivation and unconscious and conscious memory. Kandel changed his course to pursue and began his M.D. program at New York University in 1952.

== Medical school and early research ==
In 1952, Kandel started at the New York University Medical School. By graduation he was firmly interested in the biological basis of the mind. During this time, he met his future wife, Denise Bystryn. Kandel was first exposed to research in Harry Grundfest's laboratory, for six months in 1955-56, at Columbia University. Grundfest was known for using the oscilloscope to demonstrate that conduction velocity during an action potential depends on axon diameter. The researchers Kandel interacted with were contemplating the technical challenges of intracellular recordings of the electrical activity of the relatively small neurons of the vertebrate brain.

After starting his neurobiological work in the difficult thicket of the electrophysiology of the cerebral cortex, Kandel was impressed by the progress that had been made by Stephen Kuffler using a much more experimentally accessible system: neurons isolated from marine invertebrates. After becoming aware of Kuffler's work in 1955, Kandel graduated from medical school and learned from Stanley Crain how to make microelectrodes that could be used for intracellular recordings of crayfish giant axons.

Karl Lashley, a well-known American neuropsychologist, had tried but failed to identify an anatomical locus for memory storage in the cortex of the brain. When Kandel joined the Laboratory of Neurophysiology at the US National Institutes of Health in 1957, William Beecher Scoville and Brenda Milner had recently described the patient HM, who had lost the ability to form new memories after removal of his hippocampus. Kandel took on the task of performing electrophysiological recordings from hippocampal pyramidal neurons. Working with Alden Spencer, he found electrophysiological evidence for action potentials in the dendritic trees of hippocampal neurons. The team also noticed the spontaneous pacemaker-like activity of these neurons, as well as a robust recurrent inhibition in the hippocampus. They provided the first intracellular records of the electrical activity that underlies the epileptic spike (the intracellular paroxysmal depolarizing shift) and the epileptic runs of spikes (the intracellular sustained depolarization). But, with respect to memory, there was nothing in the general electrophysiological properties of hippocampal neurons that suggested why the hippocampus was special for explicit memory storage.

Kandel began to realize that memory storage must rely on modifications in the synaptic connections between neurons and that the complex connectivity of the hippocampus did not provide the best system for study of the detailed function of synapses. Kandel was aware that comparative studies of behavior, such as those by Konrad Lorenz, Niko Tinbergen, and Karl von Frisch had revealed that simple forms of learning were found even in very simple animals. Kandel felt it would be productive to select a simple animal model that would facilitate electrophysiological analysis of the synaptic changes involved in learning and memory storage. He believed that, ultimately, the results would be found to be applicable to humans. This decision was not without risk: many senior biologists and psychologists believed that nothing useful could be learned about human memory by studying invertebrate physiology.

In 1962, after completing his residency in psychiatry, Kandel went to Paris to learn about the marine mollusk Aplysia californica from Ladislav Tauc. Kandel had realized that simple forms of learning such as habituation, sensitization, classical conditioning, and operant conditioning could readily be studied with ganglia isolated from Aplysia. "While recording the behavior of a single cell in a ganglion, one nerve axon pathway to the ganglion could be stimulated weakly electrically as a conditioned [tactile] stimulus, while another pathway was stimulated as an unconditioned [pain] stimulus, following the exact protocol used for classical conditioning with natural stimuli in intact animals." Electrophysiological changes resulting from the combined stimuli could then be traced to specific synapses. In 1965 Kandel published his initial results, including a form of presynaptic potentiation that seemed to correspond to a simple form of learning.

== Faculty member at New York University Medical School ==
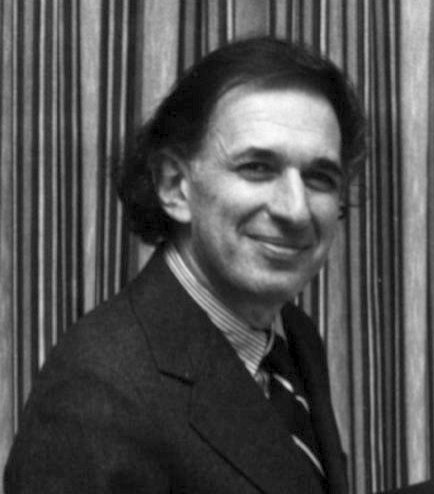
Kandel in 1978

Kandel took a position in the Departments of Physiology and Psychiatry at the New York University Medical School, eventually forming the Division of Neurobiology and Behavior. Working with Irving Kupferman and Harold Pinsker, he developed protocols for demonstrating simple forms of learning by intact Aplysia. In particular, the researchers showed that the now famous gill-withdrawal reflex, by which the slug protects its tender gill tissue from danger, was sensitive to both habituation and sensitization. By 1971 Tom Carew had joined the research group and helped extend the work from studies restricted to short-term memory to experiments that included physiological processes required for long-term memory.

By 1981, laboratory members including Terry Walters, Tom Abrams, and Robert Hawkins had been able to extend the Aplysia system into the study of classical conditioning, a finding that helped close the apparent gap between the simple forms of learning often associated with invertebrates and more complex types of learning more often recognized in vertebrates. Along with the fundamental behavioral studies, other work in the lab traced the neuronal circuits of sensory neurons, interneurons, and motor neurons involved in the learned behaviors. This allowed analysis of the specific synaptic connections that are modified by learning in the intact animals. The results from Kandel's laboratory provided solid evidence for the mechanistic basis of learning as "a change in the functional effectiveness of previously existing excitatory connections." Kandel's winning of the 2000 Nobel Prize in Physiology or Medicine was a result of his work with Aplysia on the biological mechanisms of memory storage.

== Molecular changes during learning ==
Starting in 1966 James Schwartz collaborated with Kandel on a biochemical analysis of changes in neurons associated with learning and memory storage. By this time it was known that long-term memory, unlike short-term memory, involved the synthesis of new proteins. By 1972 they had evidence that the second messenger molecule cyclic AMP (cAMP) was produced in Aplysia ganglia under conditions that cause short-term memory formation (sensitization). In 1974 Kandel moved his lab to Columbia University and became founding director of the Center for Neurobiology and Behavior. It was soon found that the neurotransmitter serotonin, acting to produce the second messenger cAMP, is involved in the molecular basis of sensitization of the gill-withdrawal reflex. By 1980, collaboration with Paul Greengard resulted in demonstration that cAMP-dependent protein kinase, also known as protein kinase A (PKA), acted in this biochemical pathway in response to elevated levels of cAMP. Steven Siegelbaum identified a potassium channel that could be regulated by PKA, coupling serotonin's effects to altered synaptic electrophysiology.

In 1983 Kandel helped form the Howard Hughes Medical Research Institute at Columbia devoted to molecular neural science. The Kandel lab then sought to identify proteins that had to be synthesized to convert short-term memories into long-lasting memories. One of the nuclear targets for PKA is the transcriptional control protein CREB (cAMP response element binding protein). In collaboration with David Glanzman and Craig Bailey, Kandel identified CREB as being a protein involved in long-term memory storage. One result of CREB activation is an increase in the number of synaptic connections. Thus, short-term memory had been linked to functional changes in existing synapses, while long-term memory was associated with a change in the number of synaptic connections.

== Experimental support for Hebbian learning ==
Some of the synaptic changes observed by Kandel's laboratory provide examples of Hebbian theory. One article describes the role of Hebbian learning in the Aplysia siphon-withdrawal reflex.

The Kandel lab has also performed important experiments using transgenic mice as a system for investigating the molecular basis of memory storage in the vertebrate hippocampus. Kandel's original idea that learning mechanisms would be conserved between all animals has been confirmed. Neurotransmitters, second messenger systems, protein kinases, ion channels, and transcription factors like CREB have been confirmed to function in both vertebrate and invertebrate learning and memory storage.

== Continuing work at Columbia University ==
Since 1974, Kandel has actively contributed to science as a member of the Division of Neurobiology and Behavior at the Department of Psychiatry at Columbia University. In 2008, he and Daniela Pollak discovered that conditioning mice to associate a specific noise with protection from harm, a behavior called "learned safety", produces a behavioral antidepressant effect comparable to that of medications. This finding, reported in Neuron, may inform further studies of the cellular interactions between antidepressants and behavioral treatments.

Kandel is known for the textbooks he has helped write, such as Principles of Neural Science. First published in 1981 and now in its sixth edition, the book is often used as a teaching and reference text in medical schools and undergraduate and graduate programs.

Kandel has been a member of the National Academy of Sciences since 1974.

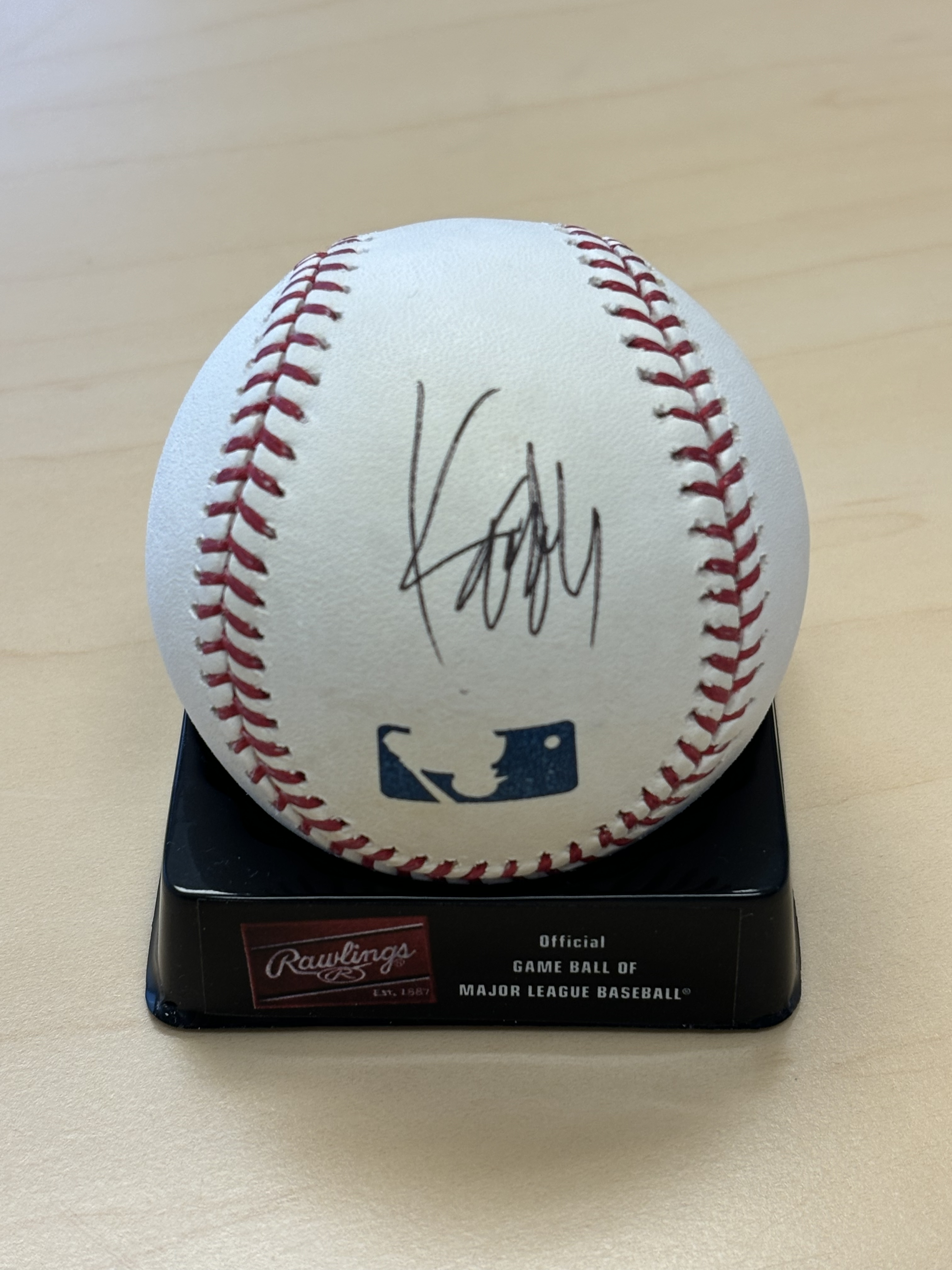
Eric Kandel autographed baseball SfN 2009

He has been at Columbia University since 1974. He lives in New York City.

== Notable former members of his lab ==
- James H. Schwartz 1964–1972: Co-author of the influential textbook Principles of Neural Science.
- John H. (Jack) Byrne 1970–1975: Professor and director of the Neuroscience Research Center at UT Health Science Center (Mcgovern Medical School); founder and editor of the research journal Learning and Memory.
- Tom Carew 1970–1983: Professor and dean of the Faculty of Arts and Sciences at New York University, Center for Neural Science. Past president of the Society for Neuroscience.
- Edgar T. Walters 1974–1980: Professor at the Medical School of the University of Texas Health Science Center at Houston.
- Kelsey C. Martin 1992–1999: Dean of the David Geffen School of Medicine at UCLA and professor in the Departments of Biological Chemistry, Psychiatry, and Biobehavioral Sciences.

== Views on Vienna ==
When Kandel won the Nobel Prize in 2000, initially some Austrian media reported of an "Austrian" Nobel Prize winner, phrasing that Kandel characterized as "typically Viennese: very opportunistic, very disingenuous, somewhat hypocritical". He also said it was "certainly not an Austrian Nobel, it was a Jewish-American Nobel". After that, he got a call from then Austrian president Thomas Klestil asking him, "How can we make things right?" Kandel said that first, Doktor-Karl-Lueger-Ring should be renamed; Karl Lueger was an anti-Semitic mayor of Vienna, cited by Hitler in Mein Kampf. The street was renamed in 2012 into Universitätsring. Second, he wanted the Jewish intellectual community to be brought back to Vienna, with scholarships for Jewish students and researchers. He also proposed a symposium on the response of Austria to Nazism, which at that time had been wanting greatly. Kandel has since accepted an honorary citizenship of Vienna and participates in the academic and cultural life of his native city, similar to Carl Djerassi. Kandel's 2012 book, The Age of Insight—as expressed in its subtitle, The Quest to Understand the Unconscious in Art, Mind, and Brain, from Vienna 1900 to the Present —represents a wide-ranging historical attempt to place Vienna at the root of cultural modernism by focussing on the personal interconnections between doctors such as Carl von Rokitansky, Emil Zuckerkandl, Sigmund Freud, with artists such as Gustav Klimt, Egon Schiele and Oskar Kokoschka and the writer Arthur Schnitzler, all of whom engaged with the "unconscious" in one way or another and influenced, Kandel claims, one another in the tight-knit salon of Berta Zuckerkandl and related occasions.

== Awards ==
- Fellow of the American Academy of Arts and Sciences (1976)
- Karl Spencer Lashley Award (1981)
- Albert Lasker Award for Basic Medical Research (1983)
- Member of the American Philosophical Society (1984)
- Gairdner Foundation International Award (1987)
- NAS Award for Scientific Reviewing of the National Academy of Sciences (1988)
- National Medal of Science (1988)
- Pasarow Award (1988)
- Member of the German Academy of Sciences Leopoldina (1989) (National Academy of Sciences, since 2008).
- Harvey Prize (1993)
- Ralph W. Gerard Prize in Neuroscience (1997)
- Wolf Prize in Medicine (1999)
- Nobel Prize in Physiology or Medicine (2000) (jointly with Arvid Carlsson and Paul Greengard)
- Charles A Dana Award for Pioneering Achievement in Health (1997)
- Austrian Decoration for Science and Art (2005)
- Benjamin Franklin Medal for Distinguished Achievement in the Sciences of the American Philosophical Society (2006)
- Viktor Frankl Award of the City of Vienna (Viktor Frankl Institute, 2008)
- Honorary citizen of the city of Vienna (2009)
- Honorary doctor at the Norwegian University of Science and Technology (2011)
- Grand Decoration of Honour in Silver with Star for Services to the Republic of Austria (2012)
- Pour le Mérite for Arts and Sciences (Germany)
- Foreign Member of the Royal Society (2013)
- Member of the prize committee for the Kavli Prize in Neuroscience, 2007–2010.
- Elected Honorary Fellow of the Royal Society of Edinburgh (2018)
- Grand Decoration of Honour in Gold with Sash for Services to the Republic of Austria (2024)

== Filmography ==
- Petra Seeger, In Search of Memory (2008)

== Selected publications ==
=== Books ===
- Kandel, Eric R. (1976), Cellular Basis of Behaviour: An Introduction to Behavioural Neurobiology, New York: W.H. Freeman & Company, ISBN 978-0-716-70522-2
- Kandel, Eric R. (1978), A Cell - Biological Approach to Learning, New York: Society for Neuroscience, ISBN 978-0-916-11007-9.
- Kandel, Eric R. (1979), Behavioural Bio of Aplysia: Origin & Evolution, New York: W.H. Freeman & Company, ISBN 978-0-716-71070-7.
- Kandel, Eric R.; Schwartz, James H.; Jessell, Thomas M.; Siegelbaum, Steven A.; Hudspeth, A. J. (2012) [1981], Principles of Neural Science (5th ed.), New York: McGraw-Hill, ISBN 978-0-071-39011-8.
- Kandel, Eric R. (1987), Molecular Neurobiology in Neurology and Psychiatry, New York: Lippincott Williams & Wilkins, ISBN 978-0-881-67305-0.
- Kandel, Eric R.; Jessell, Thomas M.; Schwartz, James H (1995), Essentials of Neural Science and Behaviour, New York: McGraw-Hill/Appleton & Lange, ISBN 978-0-838-52245-5.
- Kandel, Eric R. (2005), Psychiatry, Psychoanalysis, and the New Biology of Mind, New York: American Psychiatric Publishing, ISBN 978-1-585-62199-6.
- Kandel, Eric R. (2007), In Search of Memory: The Emergence of a New Science of Mind, New York: W. W. Norton & Company, ISBN 978-0-393-32937-7.
- Kandel, Eric R. (2012), The Age of Insight: The Quest to Understand the Unconscious in Art, Mind, and Brain, from Vienna 1900 to the Present, New York: Random House, ISBN 978-1-4000-6871-5.
- Kandel, Eric R. (2016), Reductionism in Art and Brain Science: Bridging the Two Cultures, New York: Columbia University Press, ISBN 978-0-231-17962-1.
- Kandel, Eric R. (2018), The Disordered Mind: What Unusual Brains Tell Us About Ourselves, New York: Farrar, Straus and Giroux, ISBN 9780374287863.

=== Articles ===
- Malleret G, Alarcon JM, Martel G, Takizawa S, Vronskaya S, Yin D, Chen IZ, Kandel ER, Shumyatsky GP (March 2010). "Bidirectional regulation of hippocampal long-term synaptic plasticity and its influence on opposing forms of memory". J. Neurosci. 30 (10): 3813–25. doi:10.1523/JNEUROSCI.1330-09.2010. PMC 6632240. PMID 20220016.
- Akil H, Brenner S, Kandel E, Kendler KS, King MC, Scolnick E, Watson JD, Zoghbi HY (March 2010). "Medicine. The future of psychiatric research: genomes and neural circuits". Science. 327 (5973): 1580–1. doi:10.1126/science.1188654. PMC 3091000. PMID 20339051.
- Simpson EH, Kellendonk C, Kandel E (March 2010). "A possible role for the striatum in the pathogenesis of the cognitive symptoms of schizophrenia". Neuron. 65 (5): 585–96. doi:10.1016/j.neuron.2010.02.014. PMC 4929859. PMID 20223196.
- Si K, Choi YB, White-Grindley E, Majumdar A, Kandel ER (February 2010). "Aplysia CPEB can form prion-like multimers in sensory neurons that contribute to long-term facilitation". Cell. 140 (3): 421–35. doi:10.1016/j.cell.2010.01.008. PMID 20144764. S2CID 14305206.
- Kandel ER (October 2009). "The biology of memory: a forty-year perspective". J. Neurosci. 29 (41): 12748–56. doi:10.1523/JNEUROSCI.3958-09.2009. PMC 6665299. PMID 19828785.
- Muzzio IA, Levita L, Kulkarni J, Monaco J, Kentros C, Stead M, Abbott LF, Kandel ER (June 2009). "Attention enhances the retrieval and stability of visuospatial and olfactory representations in the dorsal hippocampus". PLOS Biol. 7 (6) e1000140. doi:10.1371/journal.pbio.1000140. PMC 2696347. PMID 19564903.

== See also ==
- List of Jewish Nobel laureates
