= Harry Grundfest =

American neurologist and neurophysiologist (1904–1983)

Harry Grundfest (January 10, 1904 – October 10, 1983) was an American neurologist and neurophysiologist. He was the president of the Association of Scientific Workers, a member of the National Academy of Sciences, professor emeritus of neurology at the Columbia University College of Physicians and Surgeons, and a member of the Physiological Society of London and the Japanese Physiological Society. Grundfest conducted pioneering research on membrane electrophysiology, nerve-cell signaling, and comparative neurophysiology. His work influenced a generation of neuroscientists, including Nobel Prize winner Eric Kandel.

He was also the chairman of the American Medical Advisory Board to Hebrew University and the Hadassah Medical School.

He received the Order of the Rising Sun from the Japanese government, which is the highest award given to foreigners and seldom is given to U.S. scientists. He also received the Claude Bernard Medal of the Sorbonne, as well as the Physicians and Surgeons Distinguished Service Award from Columbia University.

== Early life and education ==
Grundfest was born in Minsk, Russian Empire, in 1904 and immigrated to the United States in 1913 with his family, including his father (a rabbi), mother and three siblings. The family settled in Kearny, New Jersey, where he graduated from high school in 1921.

He attended from Columbia University, receiving bachelor's (in 1925), master's (1926), and doctoral degrees in zoology and physiology (in 1930).

His sister was Rose Grundfest Schneider, a hematologist and geneticist associated with the University of Texas Medical Branch.

== Career and research ==
After teaching at Swarthmore College and Cornell University, Grundfest joined the Rockefeller Institute, where he worked with physiologist Herbert Spencer Gasser.

During World War II, he conducted government-sponsored research on nerve damage caused by combat injuries.

In 1945, Grundfest joined the faculty of the Columbia University College of Physicians and Surgeons, where he established a neurophysiology laboratory focused on membrane physiology and nerve-cell signaling.

Grundfest became known for combining biological and engineering approaches in the study of nervous systems and for conducting comparative neurophysiological research across numerous animal species.

His laboratory trained and mentored more than one hundred young scientists. Among the scientists influenced by Grundfest was future Nobel Prize laureate Eric Kandel, who later credited a course taught by Grundfest with directing him toward a career in neuroscience.

Grundfest also conducted research at the Marine Biological Laboratory in Woods Hole, Massachusetts, where he studied squid giant axons and other marine nervous systems.

In 1953, Grundfest was called before a committee associated with Senator Joseph McCarthy during investigations into alleged Communist affiliations. Although he denied being a Communist, he invoked the Fifth Amendment when questioned about his political beliefs.
