= Computational and Systems Neuroscience =

Computational and Systems Neuroscience (COSYNE ) is an annual scientific conference for the exchange of experimental and theoretical/computational approaches to problems in systems neuroscience. It is an important meeting for computational neuroscientists where many levels of approaches are discussed. It is a single track-meeting with oral and poster sessions and attracts over 1500 participants from a variety of disciplines, including neuroscience, computer science and machine learning. Until 2018, the 3-day long main meeting was held in Salt Lake City, followed by two days of workshops at Snowbird, Utah. In 2018, COSYNE moved to Colorado, and since 2019 has been alternating between a European site (Lisbon, Portugal) and a North American site (Montreal, Canada).

== History ==
COSYNE grew out of the Neural Information and Coding (NIC) meetings founded by Anthony Zador in 1996. The first COSYNE was organized in 2004 by Michael Shadlen, Alexandre Pouget, Carlos Brody and Anthony Zador. The current Executive Committee consists of Alexandre Pouget, Anne-Marie Oswald, Stephanie Palmer and Anthony Zador.

== Meetings ==
Year	Location	General Chair(s)	Program Chair(s)	Workshop Chair(s)	Publicity/Communication Chair	Undergraduate Travel Chair(s)	Abstracts
2021	Virtual	Anne-Marie Oswald, Srdjan Ostojic	Anne-Marie Oswald, Srdjan Ostojic	-	Adam Calhoun	-	
2020	Denver	Eugenia Chiappe, Christian Machens	Anne-Marie Oswald, Srdjan Ostojic	Catherine Hartley, Blake Richards	Adam Calhoun, Xaq Pitkow	Angela Langdon, Robert Wilson	
2019	Lisbon	Linda Wilbrecht, Brent Doiron	Eugenia Chiappe, Christian Machens	Catherine Hartley, Ralf Haefner	Xaq Pitkow	Angela Langdon, Robert Wilson	
2018	Denver	Ilana Witten, Eric Shea-Brown	Linda Wilbrecht, Brent Doiron	Laura Busse, Ralf Haefner	Xaq Pitkow	Angela Langdon, Robert Wilson	
2017	Salt Lake City	Megan Carey, Emilio Salinas	Ilana Witten, Eric Shea-Brown	Laura Busse, Alfonso Renart	Il Memming Park	Angela Langdon, Robert Wilson	
2016	Salt Lake City	Maria Geffen, Konrad Körding	Megan Carey, Emilio Salinas	Claudia Clopath, Alfonso Renart	Xaq Pitkow	Jill O'Reilly, Robert Wilson	
2015	Salt Lake City	Michael Long, Stephanie Palmer	Maria Geffen, Konrad Körding	Robert Froemke, Claudia Clopath	Xaq Pitkow		
2014	Salt Lake City	Marlene Cohen, Peter Latham	Michael Long, Stephanie Palmer	Robert Froemke, Tatyana Sharpee	Eugenia Chiappe		
2013	Salt Lake City	Nicole C. Rust, Jonathan Pillow	Marlene Cohen, Peter Latham	Jess Cardin, Tatyana Sharpee	Kanaka Rajan		
2012	Salt Lake City	James DiCarlo, Rachel Wilson	Nicole Rust, Jonathan Pillow	Brent Doiron, Jess Cardin	Mark Histed		
2011	Salt Lake City	Anne Churchland, Bartlett Mel	James DiCarlo, Rachel Wilson	Mark Laubach, Brent Doiron	Ila Fiete		Nature precedings
2010	Salt Lake City	Maneesh Sahani	Anne Churchland, Bartlett Mel	Adam Kohn, Mark Laubach	Byron Yu		Frontiers
2009	Salt Lake City	Matteo Carandini	Maneesh Sahani	Adam Kohn, Alex Huk	Alex Wade		Frontiers
2008	Salt Lake City	Eero Simoncelli	Matteo Carandini	Fritz Sommer, Jascha Sohl-Dickstein	Alex Wade		
2007	Salt Lake City	Zach Mainen	Eero Simoncelli	Fritz Sommer			
2006	Salt Lake City	Carlos Brody, Zach Mainen, Alex Pouget, Michael Shadlen, Tony Zador	Loren Frank, Michael Hausser, Adam Kepecs, Zach Mainen, Stefan Treue, Flip Sabes, Eero Simoncelli				
2005	Salt Lake City	Carlos Brody, Alex Pouget, Michael Shadlen, Tony Zador	Pam Reinagel, Philip Sabes, Zach Mainen, Eero Simoncelli, Stefan Treue				
2004	CSHL	Carlos Brody, Alex Pouget, Michael Shadlen, Tony Zador					

== Related Meetings ==
- Neural Information Processing Systems (since 1987)
- Annual meeting of the Organization for Computational Neuroscience (since 1990/1992)
- Conference on Cognitive Computational Neuroscience (since 2017)
- Bernstein Conference (since 2005)
