= Alexandre Pouget =

- Education: École normale supérieure (Paris); PhD, Salk Institute
- Scientific career
- Fields: Neuroscience
- Workplaces: University of Geneva

Alexandre Pouget is a full Professor at the University of Geneva in the department of basic neurosciences.

== Background and education ==
He received his undergraduate education at the École normale supérieure (Paris), before moving to the Salk Institute in 1988 to pursue a PhD in computational neuroscience in Terry Sejnowski's laboratory. After a postdoc at UCLA with John Schlag in 1994, he became a professor at Georgetown University in 1996, then at the University of Rochester in the Brain and Cognitive Science department in 1999 before moving to the University of Geneva in 2011.

== Memberships, editorial activities, and awards ==
Pouget was awarded the Carnegie Prize in Brain and Mind Sciences in 2016 and the Swartz Prize in Theoretical and Computational Neuroscience in 2025 . He is the author of more than 100 papers and the editor of one book. He co-founded the Computational and Systems Neuroscience conference in 2004 with Anthony Zador. In 2016, he co-founded the International Brain Laboratory with Zachary Mainen and Michael Hausser, the first international CERN-like collaboration in systems neuroscience.

== Research interests ==
His research focuses on general theories of representation and computation in neural circuits with a strong emphasis on neural theories of probabilistic inference. This approach is built on the notion that knowledge in the brain takes the form of probability distributions and new knowledge is acquired via probabilistic inference in contrast to the more classical approach to rationality that relies on pure logic. This allows robust, sometimes optimal, computations in the presence of uncertainty, which applies to almost all real-life situations. He is currently deploying this framework to a wide range of topics including olfactory processing, spatial representations, sensory-motor transformations, multisensory integration, perceptual learning, attentional control, visual search and decision making.

== Movies ==
Alexandre Pouget is featured in Jean-Stephane Bron's movie 'The brain'('Cinq nouvelles du cerveau', 2022).
