= Rachel Wilson (disambiguation) =

Rachel Wilson (born 1977) is a Canadian actress.

Rachel Wilson may also refer to:

- Rachel Wilson (neurobiologist), an American neurobiologist
- Rachel Wilson (One Life to Live), a fictional character on the ABC Daytime soap opera One Life to Live
- Rachel Wilson (The Amazing World of Gumball), a fictional character in The Amazing World of Gumball
- Rachel Wilson (Quaker minister) (1720–1775), English Quaker minister
