= Susana Lima =

Portuguese neuroscientist

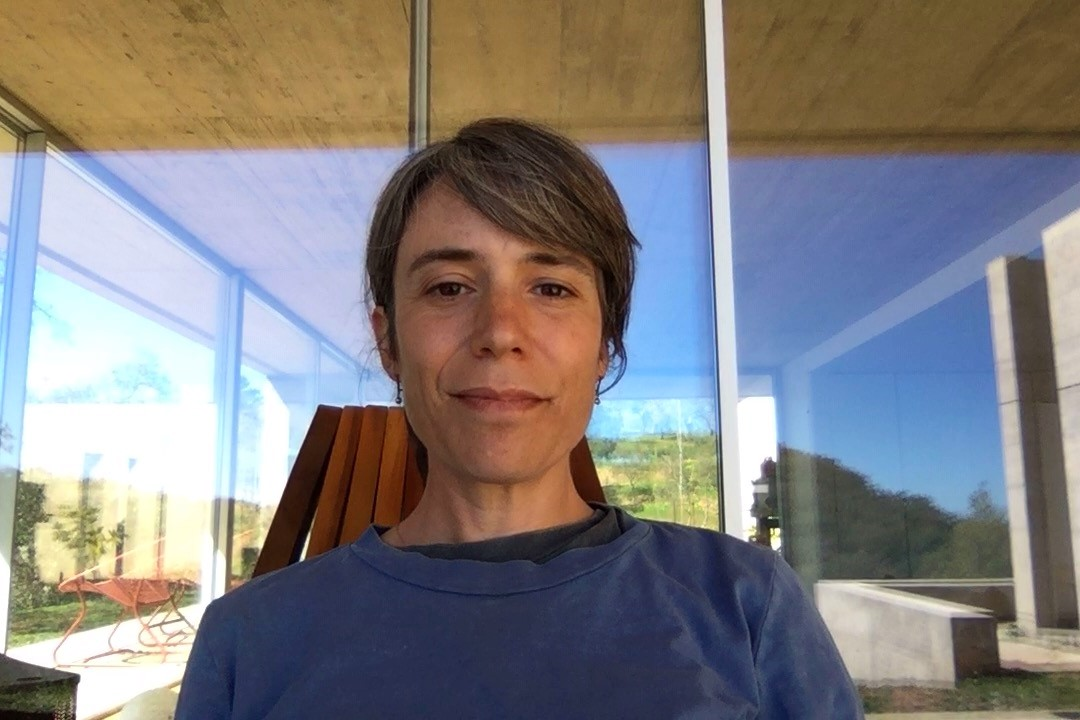
Susana Lima

Susana Q. Lima is a Portuguese neuroscientist and principal investigator at the Champalimaud Centre for the Unknown in Lisbon, Portugal. Her research studies neural mechanisms of sexual behavior and mate choice.

== Early life and education ==
Susana Lima was born in the Azores Islands, and moved to Northern Portugal when she was young. She attended middle and high school near Porto, Portugal. During her last six months of university in Portugal, Lima participated in a project abroad in Amsterdam where she studied the effect of heat shock in yeast.

In 2005, Lima obtained her Ph.D. from the doctoral program in Biology and Medicine at the Gulbenkian Institute for Science. During this time, she was able to study abroad in New York at Memorial Sloan Kettering as well as Yale University under the supervision of Gero Miesenböck. Following her Ph.D, Lima completed her postdoctoral research with Cold Spring Harbor Laboratory under neuroscientist Anthony Zador.

== Research career ==
Lima completed her Ph.D. at the Memorial Sloan Kettering Cancer Center in New York working in Gero Miesenböck’s lab. She spent five years researching and developing optogenetics, a research technique that uses light to activate a single neuron in order to study the processes activated by the neuron. Her findings, published in Cell in 2005, were the first reported use of optogenetics. Lima introduced P2X2 receptors, activated by ATP, into flies in order to activate specific neurons using a photosensitive form of ATP. In this way, she was able to activate a specific neuronal path that controls the mechanism by which flies jump and fly by shining a light on transgenic flies.

During her postdoctoral training in Anthony Zador’s lab, Lima used optogenetic tools to develop a new method to identify neuronal subtypes in vivo on the rodent auditory cortex. This technique was called optotagging. After her accomplishments at Cold Spring Harbor, she returned to Portugal in 2008 and became part of the Champalimaud Neuroscience Program.

Some of her most recent research involves investigating how the brain controls sexual behavior through electrophysiology, optogenetics, anatomy and behavioral studies. Her publications include studies on prolactin’s involvement in the post-ejaculatory refractory period, how the ventromedial hypothalamus of the brain serves to control mating behavior, how sexual imprinting overrides order effects during sampling of prospective mates, and the neural circuits for reproduction. Her lab's long term goal is to test the hypothesis that mate choice has an impact on the regulation of sexual behavior.

== Personal life ==
Soon after their marriage, Lima and her husband, Zachary Mainen, returned to Portugal to help start the Champalimaud Neuroscience Program.
