= Nicole C. Rust =

American neuroscientist

- Education: University of Idaho; New York University; Massachusetts Institute of Technology
- Known for: Visual Perception, Visual Recognition Memory
- Awards: Simons Pivot Fellow, Troland Research Award, McKnight Scholar, NSF CAREER Award, Sloan Fellow
- Scientific career
- Fields: Neuroscience, Psychology
- Workplaces: University of Pennsylvania
- Academic advisors: J. Anthony Movshon; Eero P. Simoncelli; James DiCarlo
- Website: www.nicolecrust.com

Nicole C. Rust is an American neuroscientist, psychologist, and a Professor of Psychology at the University of Pennsylvania. She is the author of Elusive Cures: Why Neuroscience Hasn't Solved Brain Disorders and How We Can Change That. She studies visual perception, visual recognition memory, and mood (psychology). She is recognized for significant advancements in experimental psychology and neuroscience.

Rust was the recipient of the 2021 Troland Research Award from the National Academy of Sciences for her fundamental contributions to understanding how the cortex makes use of complex visual information to guide intelligent behavior. She was named a Simons Pivot Fellow in 2025, a McKnight Foundation Scholar (2013), received an NSF CAREER Award (2013) and was named an Alfred P. Sloan Research Fellow (2010).

== Education and early career ==
Rust received her bachelor's degree in from the University of Idaho in 1997. She then went on to receive her PhD in Neuroscience from New York University in 2004 under the mentorship of J. Anthony Movshon, and Eero Simoncelli. There, her work focused on how the primate brain processes information about visual motion, including in the primary visual cortex and area MT.

== Career and research ==
Rust completed postdoctoral research at the Massachusetts Institute of Technology between 2004 and 2006. There she worked under the mentorship of James DiCarlo, studying how the brain identifies the objects that are present in a visual scene.

Rust joined the faculty in the Department of Psychology at the University of Pennsylvania in 2009. Her lab has focused on understanding how the brain uses visual information to solve different tasks, including finding sought objects and remembering the images that have been encountered.

Rust's group also creates machine learning algorithms that mimic neural circuits of memory.

== Science communication ==
Rust is the author of the book Elusive Cures: Why Neuroscience Hasn't Solved Brain Disorders and How We Can Change That. In it, she describes her personal journey to understand why brain research has been accelerating rapidly for decades, but the translation of discoveries into treatments and cures has not happened as many expected.
