= Anne Churchland =

Neuroscientist

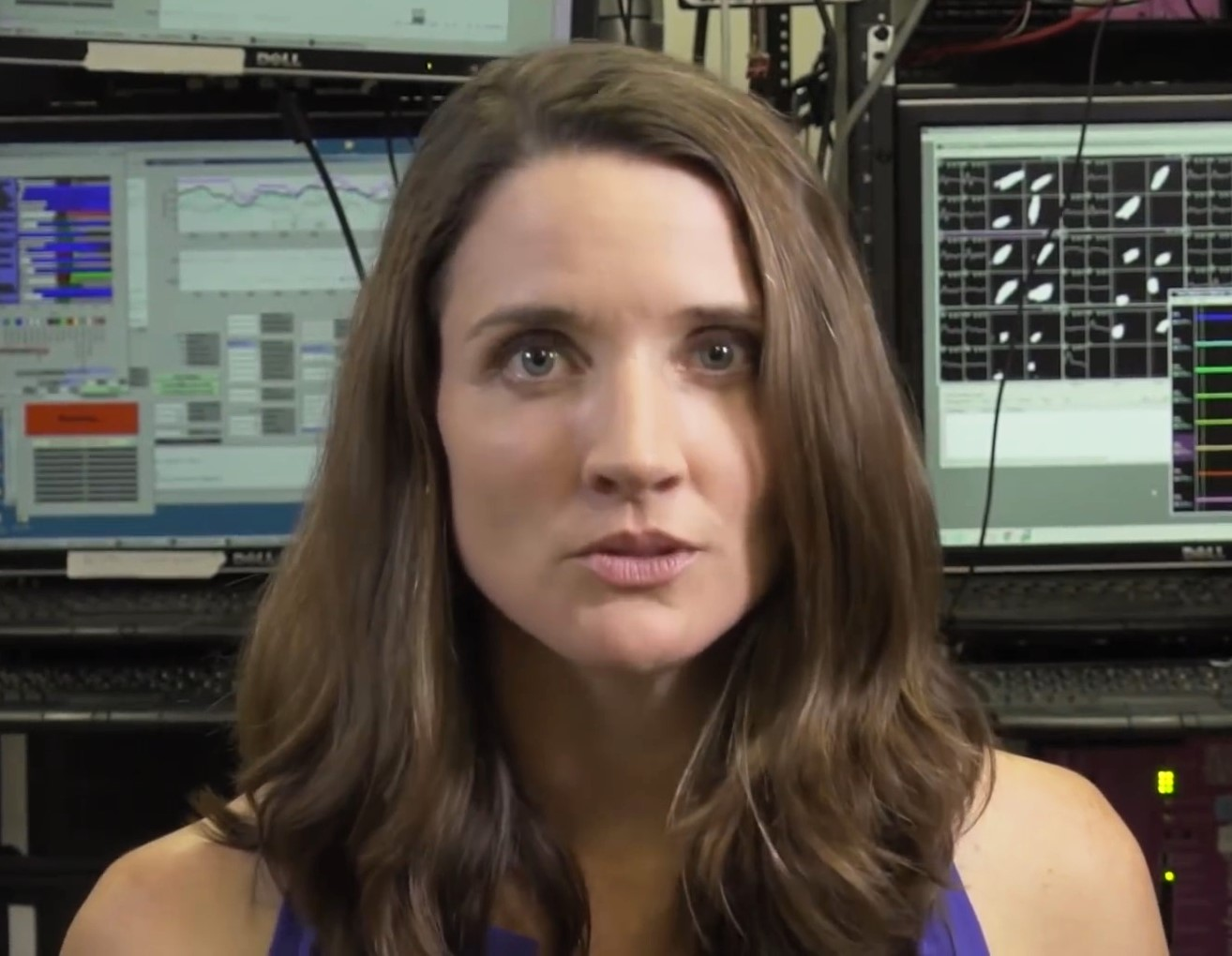
- Churchland speaks to the Wellcome Trust in 2024
- Education: B.A., Wellesley College; PhD, UCSF
- Known for: Neural circuits underlying perceptual decision making and multisensory integration
- Scientific career
- Fields: Neuroscience
- Workplaces: University of California, Los Angeles
- Thesis: Representations of eye and image velocity in motion sensitive cortex (2003)
- Doctoral advisor: Stephen Lisberger
- Other academic advisors: Michael Shadlen

Anne K. Churchland is a neuroscientist at University of California, Los Angeles. Her laboratory studies the function of the posterior parietal cortex in cognitive processes such as decision-making and multisensory integration. One of her discoveries is that individual neurons in rodent posterior parietal cortex can multitask i.e. play a role in multiple behaviors. Another discovery is that rodents are similar to humans in their ability to perform multisensory integration, i.e. to integrate stimuli from two different modalities such as vision and hearing.

Churchland is an advocate of using rodents to study these cognitive processes, and together with scientists Zachary Mainen and Anthony Zador at Cold Spring Harbor Laboratory she has made substantial advances in bringing to these species the advanced behavioral techniques previously available only in primates.

Churchland is a founding member of the International Brain Laboratory and an advisor to the Allen Institute for Brain Science.

She is the founder of Anneslist, a website which promotes equality in representation across genders in scientific meetings.

== Early life ==
She is the daughter of analytical philosopher Patricia Churchland and philosopher Paul Churchland. Her brother, Mark Churchland, is also a neuroscientist, working at Columbia University.

== Education ==
Churchland studied cognitive development at Wellesley College as an undergraduate where she received a B.A . in mathematics and psychology. In 2003, she received her Ph.D. in neuroscience from the University of California, San Francisco, advised by Dr. Stephen Lisberger. Her doctoral research focused on how the primate extrastriate cortex processes visual motion information.

Afterwards, from 2004 to 2010, Churchland worked as a postdoctoral fellow at the University of Washington's Physiology and Biophysics department for Dr. Michael Shadlen. She continued her research on primates to study sensory decision making, which included both experimental and theoretical work. During this time, Churchland was funded by a Pathways to Independence (K99) Award from the National Eye Institute.

== Research ==
From 2010 to May 2020, Churchland was a principal investigator at Cold Spring Harbor Laboratory.

In May 2020, Churchland moved to the University of California, Los Angeles where she serves as a professor in neurobiology. She currently holds the Arnold B. Scheibel, M.D. Chair for Brain Research.

Anne Churchland worked on the science behind movement, specifically fidgeting, and its relation to the process of thinking. One hypothesis they developed is that fidgeting may be the instrument or way in which we begin and continue the process of thinking. This research, Churchland believes, may offer useful insight as to why people with ADHD, when compared to average people, may require more movement to concentrate.

Churchland continues to do research on the neural mechanisms of decision making, focusing on multisensory integration. Churchland's lab measures and manipulates neurons in the cortical region, while rodents make decisions on external stimuli. They also use mathematical analyses to understand neural population activity.

== DEI in Science ==
Churchland is also known for her advocacy for women in neuroscience. She created anneslist, a directory for women in the fields of systems and computational neuroscience. It began as a practical list of women in the field she encountered and could nominate as speakers. Since then, this work has been recognized by the Society for Neuroscience in 2017, where Churchland was awarded The Louise Hanson Marshall Special Recognition Award for her promotion of women in neuroscience through efforts that are not necessarily research-related.

== Selected awards ==
McKnight Scholar Award (2012)

Pew Scholar in the Biomedical Sciences by The Pew Charitable Trusts (2014)

Klingenstein-Simons Fellowship in the Neurosciences from the Simons Foundation and the Esther A. and Joseph Klingenstein Fund (2014)

The Louise Hanson Marshall Special Recognition Award from the Society of Neuroscience (2017)

The Pradel Research Award from the National Academy of Sciences (2025)
