= Alexei Koulakov =

- Born
- Occupations: Theoretical physicist and neuroscientist

Academic background
- Education: Engineer-Physicist (MS equivalent), Applied Mathematics and Physics (1990); PhD., Physics (1998)
- Alma mater: Moscow Institute of Physics and Technology; University of Minnesota

Academic work
- Institutions: Cold Spring Harbor Laboratory

Alexei Koulakov is a theoretical physicist and a neuroscientist. He is the Charles Robertson Professor of Neuroscience at the Cold Spring Harbor Laboratory.

Koulakov's group has used mathematics and theoretical physics to explore the brain, with focus on neural computation, brain development, and the evolution of brain architecture for optimal function. He received the Sloan Fellowship in Theoretical Neuroscience from 1998 to 2001 and the NIH Director's Transformative Research Award in 2018.

Koulakov's research has been featured in media outlets, including Physics Today, Wired, Nautilus Magazine, Medical Xpress, Long Island Business News, and Scientific Inquirer.

== Education and early career ==
Koulakov earned an Engineer-physicist degree (equivalent to an MS) in Applied Mathematics and Physics from the Moscow Institute of Physics and Technology in 1990. From 1988 to 1993, he worked as an Engineer in the Theoretical Department at the Institute of Nuclear Energy in Troitsk, Moscow region. He then pursued a PhD in Theoretical Physics at the University of Minnesota, completing it in 1998. Following his doctoral studies, he engaged in a postdoctoral fellowship in Neuroscience in the Sloan Center for Theoretical Neurobiology at the Salk Institute for Biological Studies in La Jolla, California, where he conducted research from 1998 to 2001.

== Career ==
Koulakov joined the Department of Physics at the University of Utah as an assistant professor in 2001. In 2003, he moved to Cold Spring Harbor Laboratory as an assistant professor, became an associate professor in 2008, and then was promoted to professor in 2012. He held that role until 2021, when he became the Charles Robertson Professor.

Koulakov has served as the director of the Swartz Center for Computational Neuroscience at Cold Spring Harbor Laboratory. He has organized workshops, including the Cosyne workshop in March 2018, which focused on exploring causal links between neural responses and behavior, and another, on computational olfaction, in March 2005 at Snowbird, Utah.

== Research ==
Koulakov is most known for his contributions to condensed matter physics, computational neuroscience, brain evolution, neural development, olfactory coding, neural stem cells, machine learning, and artificial intelligence. He and his team have studied neural computation, brain development and evolution, including how neurons process information, how brain networks assemble during development, and how brain architecture evolved to facilitate its function.

== Contributions to neuroscience ==
=== Computational principles of neural development ===
Koulakov and his colleagues developed a predictive quantitative model of neural development that integrated the effects of molecular guidance cues and activity-dependent neural plasticity (learning). This model explained the effects of genetic, surgical, and pharmacological manipulations on neural connectivity across species. Refined for the visual system, it predicted connectivity changes in genetically modified animals and was generalizable to other forms of connectivity.

=== Principles of cortical evolution ===
Koulakov's research has focused on quantitative models of brain evolution, including theoretical models of cortical maps, the development of cortical areas and their connectivity, and the influence of the genomic bottleneck on cortical network evolution.

=== Disposable neural stem cell hypothesis ===
Examining the decline in hippocampal neurogenesis with age, Koulakov's quantitative analysis revealed that this decline was due to the depletion of the neural stem cell pool, which occurred as these cells were activated to generate new neurons. Activated stem cells underwent asymmetric divisions to produce neurons and eventually matured into astrocytes. His team proposed a "disposable stem cell" model which explains the age-related decrease in stem cells as resulting from production of new neurons.

=== Olfactory coding ===
In collaboration with his colleagues, Koulakov devised theories for olfactory coding that helped build an understanding of olfactory information processing. These included theories for temporal processing in the early olfactory system, such as the primacy theory, structured connectivity theory, and sparse representations in the early olfactory system.

=== Decision making and meta-cognition ===
Koulakov's team has developed theories of decision-making in collaboration with experimental groups. They have formulated a theory of decision confidence that has been experimentally tested.

=== Reinforcement learning and motivated behavior ===
Koulakov and his colleagues established a deep neural network-based reinforcement learning model of motivational salience, allowing agents to quickly adapt their behavior to changing rewards based on dynamic needs. This approach improved the interpretability of behavioral data by inferring motivational dynamics in the brain. By linking sequential decision-making theories—including the marginal value theorem, reinforcement learning, and Bayesian methods—his research team proposed an optimal decision rule for stay-or-leave choices in natural environments.

=== Attractor dynamics is short- and long-term memory ===
Through joint efforts, Koulakov formulated theories of robust short-term (working) memory systems using attractor neural networks, and discovered that attractor states can be stabilized in networks exhibiting long-term synaptic plasticity, a phenomenon that may result from memory consolidation.

=== NeuroAI ===
Spanning 2019 to 2024, Koulakov worked at the intersection of neuroscience and AI, aiming to use insights from nervous system studies to develop improved AI algorithms.

== Contributions to theoretical physics ==
Koulakov and his colleagues theoretically identified a new quantum state of electrons in quantum Hall samples under weak magnetic fields, resembling a liquid crystal phase, which they described as "Quantum Hall Nematics". This theoretical discovery was later confirmed experimentally. Within mesoscopic physics, they contributed to understanding the properties of small particles, such as quantum dots with a few electrons and superconducting vortex cores.

== Awards and honors ==
- 2018 – NIH Director's Transformative Research Award, NIH

== Selected articles ==
- Koulakov, A. A., Fogler, M. M., & Shklovskii, B. I. (1996). Charge density wave in two-dimensional electron liquid in weak magnetic field. Physical review letters, 76(3), 499.
- Fogler, M. M., Koulakov, A. A., & Shklovskii, B. I. (1996). Ground state of a two-dimensional electron liquid in a weak magnetic field. Physical Review B, 54(3), 1853.
- Koulakov, A. A., Raghavachari, S., Kepecs, A., & Lisman, J. E. (2002). Model for a robust neural integrator. Nature neuroscience, 5(8), 775–782.
- Chklovskii, D. B., & Koulakov, A. A. (2004). Maps in the brain: what can we learn from them?. Annu. Rev. Neurosci., 27(1), 369–392.
- Encinas, J. M., Michurina, T. V., Peunova, N., Park, J. H., Tordo, J., Peterson, D. A., ... & Enikolopov, G. (2011). Division-coupled astrocytic differentiation and age-related depletion of neural stem cells in the adult hippocampus. Cell stem cell, 8(5), 566–579.
