= Paul Churchland =

Canadian philosopher

- Born: Paul Montgomery Churchland; October 21, 1942 (age 84); Vancouver, British Columbia, Canada
- Spouse: Patricia Churchland (m. 1969)

Education
- Education: University of Pittsburgh
- Doctoral advisor: Wilfrid Sellars

Philosophical work
- Era: Contemporary philosophy
- Region: Western philosophy
- School: Analytic philosophy
- Institutions: University of Pittsburgh; University of California, San Diego
- Main interests: Neurophilosophy, philosophy of science, philosophy of mind, artificial intelligence, epistemology
- Notable ideas: Eliminative materialism Word–world relations

Paul Montgomery Churchland (born October 21, 1942) is a Canadian philosopher known for his studies in neurophilosophy and the philosophy of mind. After earning a Ph.D. from the University of Pittsburgh under Wilfrid Sellars (1969), Churchland rose to the rank of full professor at the University of Manitoba before accepting the Valtz Family Endowed Chair in Philosophy at the University of California, San Diego (UCSD) and joint appointments in that institution's Institute for Neural Computation and on its Cognitive Science Faculty.

As of February 2017, Churchland is recognised as Professor Emeritus at the UCSD, and is a member of the Board of Trustees of the Moscow Center for Consciousness Studies of Moscow State University. Churchland is the husband of philosopher Patricia Churchland, with whom he collaborates closely.

== Biography ==
=== Early life and education ===
Paul Montgomery Churchland was born in Vancouver, British Columbia, Canada, on October 21, 1942. Growing up in Vancouver, Churchland's father was a high school science teacher and his mother took in sewing. As a boy, he was obsessed with science fiction; he was particularly struck by the ideas in Robert A. Heinlein's Orphans of the Sky. Churchland liked building things in his father's woodworking and metal shop in their basement, and expected to become an aerodynamical engineer.

At the University of British Columbia, Churchland began with classes in math and physics, intending to pursue engineering. Conversations with fellow students in the summer before his sophomore year inspired him to begin taking philosophy classes. He graduated with a Bachelor of Arts in 1964

He earned his Ph.D. from the University of Pittsburgh in 1969, his dissertation entitled "Persons and P-Predicates" written with Wilfrid Sellars as his advisor.

=== Academic career ===
In 1969, Churchland took a position at the University of Manitoba, where he would teach for fifteen years, becoming a full professor in 1979. He spent a year at the Institute for Advanced Study in Princeton, and joined the faculty at the University of California, San Diego in 1984. There, he served as Department Chair from 1986–1990.

As of this February 2017, Churchland is recognised as Professor Emeritus at the University of California, San Diego, where he earlier held the Valtz Family Endowed Chair in Philosophy (through 2011), and continues to appear as a philosophy faculty member on the UCSD Interdisciplinary Ph.D. Program in Cognitive Science and with the affiliated faculty of the UCSD Institute for Neural Computation. As of February 2017, he is also a member of the Board of Trustees of the Center for Consciousness Studies of the Philosophy Department, Moscow State University.

== Philosophy ==
Churchland's work is in the school of analytic philosophy in western philosophy, with interests in epistemology and the philosophy of science, and specific principal interests in the philosophy of mind and in neurophilosophy and artificial intelligence. His work has been described as being influenced by the work of W. V. O. Quine, Thomas Kuhn, Russell Hanson, Wilfrid Sellars, and Paul Feyerabend.

=== Eliminative materialism ===
Along with his wife, Churchland is a major proponent of eliminative materialism, the belief that

everyday, common-sense, 'folk' psychology, which seeks to explain human behavior in terms of the beliefs and desires of agents, is actually a deeply flawed theory that must be eliminated in favor of a mature cognitive neuroscience.

where by folk psychology is meant everyday mental concepts such as beliefs, feelings, and desires, which are viewed as theoretical constructs without coherent definition, and thus destined to be obviated by a scientific understanding of human nature. From the perspective of Tadeusz Zawidzki, Churchland's concept of eliminativism is suggested as early as his book Scientific Realism and the Plasticity of Mind (1979), with its most explicit formulation appearing in a Journal of Philosophy essay, "Eliminative Materialism and the Propositional Attitudes" (1981).

Churchland believes that beliefs are not ontologically real; that is, that a future, fully matured neuroscience is likely to have no need for "beliefs" (see propositional attitudes), in the same manner that modern science discarded such notions as legends or witchcraft. According to Churchland, such concepts will not merely be reduced to more finely grained explanation and retained as useful proximate levels of description, but will be strictly eliminated as wholly lacking in correspondence to precise objective phenomena, such as activation patterns across neural networks. He points out that the history of science has seen many posits that were considered as real entities: such as phlogiston; caloric; the luminiferous ether; and vital forces that were thus eliminated.

=== Philosophy of the mind ===
Moreover, in The Engine of Reason, The Seat of the Soul, Churchland suggests that consciousness might be explained in terms of a recurrent neural network with its hub in the intralaminar nucleus of the thalamus, and feedback connections to all parts of the cortex. He acknowledges that this proposal will likely be found in error with regard to the neurological details, but states his belief that it is on the right track in its use of recurrent neural networks to account for consciousness. This has been described as a reductionist rather than eliminativist account of consciousness.

== Personal life ==
Churchland is the husband of philosopher Patricia Churchland, and it has been noted that "Their work is so similar that they are sometimes discussed, in journals and books, as one person."

The Churchlands are the parents of two children, Mark Churchland and Anne Churchland, both of whom are neuroscientists.

== Works ==
=== Popular writing ===
- Churchland, Patricia Smith; Churchland, Paul (1990). "Could a Machine Think?". Scientific American. 262 (1, January): 32–37. Bibcode:1990SciAm.262a..32C. doi:10.1038/scientificamerican0190-32. PMID 2294584. "[Subtitle:] Classical AI is unlikely to yield conscious machines; systems that mimic the brain might."^{[subscription required]}

=== Scholarly work ===
==== Books ====
Churchland has authored several books in philosophy, which have been translated into many languages. His works are as follows:

- Churchland, Paul (1986) [1979]. Scientific Realism and the Plasticity of Mind. Cambridge Studies in Philosophy (1st paperback ed.). Cambridge, UK: Cambridge University Press. pp. 157 pp. doi:10.1017/CBO9780511625435. ISBN 0-521-33827-1. ISSN 0950-6306.
- —— (1984). Matter and Consciousness. Cambridge, MA, USA: MIT Press.
- —— (1985). Images of Science: Scientific Realism versus Constructive Empiricism. Chicago, IL: The University of Chicago Press.
- —— (1989). A Neurocomputational Perspective: The Nature of Mind and the Structure of Science. Cambridge, MA: MIT Press. ISBN 0-262-53106-2.
- —— (1995). The Engine of Reason, The Seat of the Soul: A Philosophical Journey into the Brain. Cambridge, MA: MIT Press. ISBN 0-262-53142-9.
- ——; Churchland, Patricia Smith (1998). On the Contrary: Critical Essays, 1987-1997. Cambridge, MA, USA: MIT Press. ISBN 0-262-53165-8.
- —— (2007). Neurophilosophy at Work. Cambridge, MA, USA: MIT Press. ISBN 978-0-521-86472-5.
- Churchland, Paul (2012). Plato's Camera: How the Physical Brain Captures a Landscape of Abstract Universals. Cambridge, MA: MIT Press. ISBN 978-0-262-01686-5.

His book Matter and Consciousness has been frequently and extensively reprinted. Both Scientific Realism and the Plasticity of Mind and A Neurocomputational Perspective have been reprinted.

=== Essays ===
Professor Churchland has written a number of published articles, some of which have been translated into other languages, including several that have had a substantial impact in philosophy. Essays which have been reprinted include:

- Churchland, Paul (1981). "Eliminative Materialism and the Propositional Attitudes". Journal of Philosophy. 78 (2, February): 67–90. doi:10.2307/2025900. JSTOR 2025900. See also the PDF version at K. A. Akins' web pages at Simon Fraser University.
- —— (1981). "Functionalism, Qualia, and Intentionality". Philosophical Topics. 12: 121–145. doi:10.5840/philtopics198112146.
- —— (1985). "Reduction, Qualia and Direct Introspection of Brain States". Journal of Philosophy. 82 (1): 8–28. doi:10.2307/2026509. JSTOR 2026509.
- —— (1986). "Some Reductive Strategies in Cognitive Neurobiology". Mind. 95.
- —— (1988). "Folk Psychology and the Explanation of Human Behavior". Proceedings of the Aristotelian Society. Supp. Vol. LXII.
- —— (1990). "On the Nature of Theories: A Neurocomputational Perspective". Minnesota Studies in the Philosophy of Science. XIV.
- —— (1991). "Intertheoretic Reduction: A Neuroscientist's Field Guide". Seminars in Neuroscience. 2.
- —— (1995). "The Neural Representation of Social Reality". Mind and Morals.

== See also ==
- American philosophy
- Canadian philosophy
- Materialism
- Scientism
