= Thomas P. Dooley =

Thomas P. Dooley is the author of Praying Faith, Hope When Everything Seems Hopeless, and Half-Truths are Lies. He is the founder and President of Path Clearer Inc., and has been a co-founder and/or board member of various Judeo-Christian ministries and other nonprofit organizations. He is a frequent guest contributor to television, radio, and print media.

Dooley is an entrepreneurial biomedical research scientist and has served in various leadership roles in the pharmaceutical and biotechnology industry and in academia. He was the Founder and CEO of IntegriDerm Inc. and ALtruis LLC, and the recipient of an endowed chair position at Southern Research Institute. He received a BS degree from the University of Kansas and a PhD from Indiana University Bloomington, followed by a Helen Hay Whitney Postdoctoral Fellowship at the Imperial Cancer Research Fund in London, England. He has authored 66 scientific publications, primarily in the disciplines of molecular biology, dermatology, and oncology.

In 2010 Dooley was a candidate/nominee for the Alabama State Board of Education.
