= Helen Hay Whitney Foundation =

U.S. medical research foundation

- Named after: Helen Hay Whitney
- Formation: 1943
- Founder: Joan Whitney Payson
- Founded at: New York
- Website: hhwf.org

The Helen Hay Whitney Foundation, established in New York in 1943 by Joan Whitney Payson in cooperation with the estate planning of her mother, Helen Hay Whitney (1875–1944), awards the "Helen Hay Whitney Postdoctoral Fellowship" to support postdoctoral research in the biomedical sciences.

The Foundation awards approximately 20 fellowships per year. The award is one of four highly competitive postdoctoral awards in the life sciences, and many of North America's leading scientists and medical researchers were supported in the early stages of their career by the Whitney Foundation.

Members of the Scientific Advisory Committee have included:

- Harry Eagle
- Stephen C. Harrison
- Daniel Kahne
- Thomas Jessell
- Mark Krasnow
- Maclyn McCarty
- Barbara Meyer
- Erin O'Shea
- Ronald T. Raines
- Matthew Scharff
- Julie Theriot
- Christopher T. Walsh
- Jonathan Weissman
- S. Lawrence Zipursky

Notable fellows have included:

- Eric J. Ackerman
- David Agard
- Ronald A. Albright
- David J. Anderson
- Karen M. Arndt
- Cornelia Bargmann
- Margaret Baron
- Mary Anne Berberich
- Megan Carey
- Elizabeth Chen
- Stephen Dinardo
- Chris Q. Doe
- Thomas P. Dooley
- David G. Drubin
- Stephen J. Elledge
- Stanley Fields
- Steven Finkel
- Andrew Fire
- Stephen C. Harrison
- Richard Henderson
- Tyler Jacks
- Wendell Lim
- Tomas Lindahl
- Santa J. Ono
- Susan Parkhurst
- Stanley Perlman
- Ronald T. Raines
- Michael Rosbash
- Gerald M. Rubin
- Robert Weinberg
- Keith Yamamoto
- Rao Yi

== See also ==
- Damon Runyon Cancer Research Foundation
- Jane Coffin Childs Memorial Fund for Medical Research
- Life Sciences Research Foundation
