= Bernstein Center Freiburg =

Neurosciences research facility at the University of Freiburg

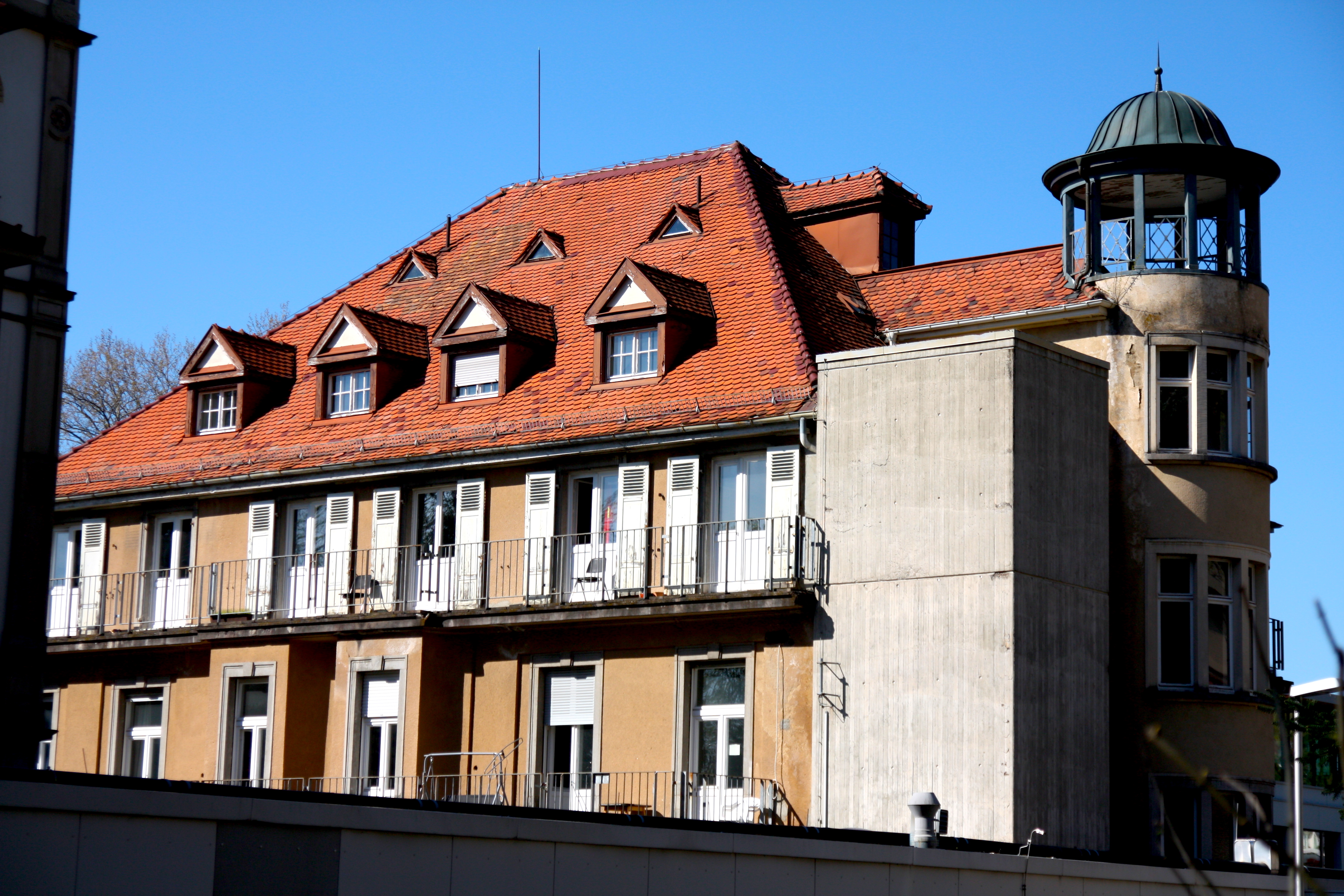
The Bernstein Center Freiburg resides in Freiburg-Herdern

The Bernstein Center Freiburg (BCF) is the central facility for experimental and theoretical research in the areas of computational neuroscience and neurotechnology at the University of Freiburg. As a member of the national network for computational neuroscience (NNCN), founded by the Federal Ministry of Education and Research (BMBF) in 2004, the BCF is one of a total of six Bernstein Centers in Germany. Like the other Bernstein Centers, it was named after the German physiologist Julius Bernstein. The BCF is located in the former Institute of Brain Research ("Neurophys") in Freiburg-Herdern. Initially known as Bernstein Center for Computational Neuroscience Freiburg (BCCN), the institute was renamed Bernstein Center Freiburg in 2010. The coordination site for the national Bernstein Network resides in the building of the Bernstein Center Freiburg.

Research projects include the Bernstein Focus for Neurotechnology (BFNT), which has become an important institution in the sustained aggregation of research in neurotechnology and computational neuroscience in Freiburg. Furthermore, the Bernstein Center Freiburg is a foundation of the cluster of excellence BrainLinks-BrainTools.

Currently, 34 PhD-Students from 13 countries and four continents are enrolled at the BCF, with backgrounds in disciplines such as physics, mathematics, electrical engineering, biomedical engineering, biology, as well as computer science and astrophysics. The Bernstein Center Freiburg is a leading partner in the new MSc Neuroscience in Freiburg, an interdisciplinary MSc program of three faculties of the university.

== Bernstein Werkstatt ==
In April 2013, the Bernstein Center Freiburg founded the Bernstein Werkstatt. The former workshop of the building now serves as a creative space in which science meets arts and culture. Their event series "Science Jam" and "Café Scientifique" have been established to make the most recent neuroscientific research results in Freiburg relatable to both patients and the general public. Furthermore, they have inspired an artistic engagement with neuroscientific topics. The Bernstein Center Freiburg in cooperation with the BrainLinks-BrainTools cluster of excellence was able to organise a total 13 events since the founding of the event series.

== NeuroCampus ==
Since December 2015, the Bernstein Center Freiburg is also a leading partner in the NeuroCampus project and will implement the public outreach components of the project. The trinational project brings together the expertise leading neuroscientific research institutions in the Upper Rhine region.
