= Megan Carey =

Neuroscientist

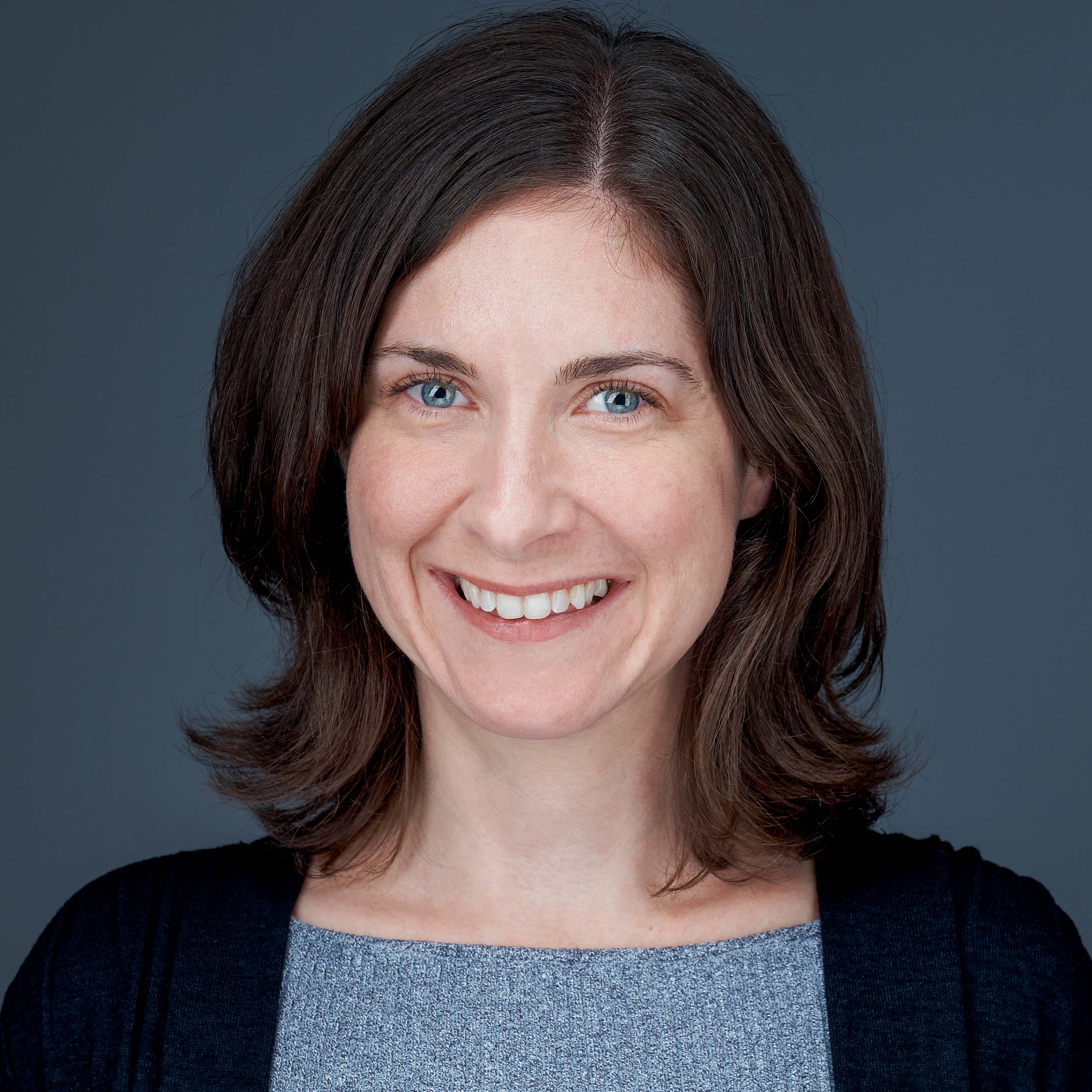
Megan Carey (photo by Tor Stensola)

Megan Carey is a neuroscientist and Group Leader of the Neural Circuits and Behavior Laboratory at the Champalimaud Centre for the Unknown in Lisbon, Portugal. She is known for her work on how the cerebellum controls coordinated movement.

== Education and early career ==
Carey completed her Bachelor and Master degrees at Wesleyan University in Connecticut. She received her PhD in 2005 from University of California at San Francisco where she studied neural mechanisms of motor learning in Stephen Lisberger's lab. She received the Krevans Distinguished Dissertation Award for her work. Carey completed her postdoctoral work at Harvard Medical School as a Helen Hay Whitney Fellow in Wade Regehr's lab. There, she focused on the cell biology of neuromodulation and synaptic plasticity. Since 2010, she has been an independent group leader of the Neural Circuits and Behavior Laboratory.

== Research ==
Carey's work focuses on the quantitative analysis of movement, using behavior, genetics, and physiology to dissect locomotion. She is interested in understanding how the cerebellum controls coordinated movement.

Her research group is focused on creating quantitative methodology to study coordinated movement. She developed an automated movement tracking system, called "LocoMouse" to capture and analyze paw, nose, and tail movements of normal mice and of mice affected by ataxia defects. Using this system, she discovered that the forward steps of the ataxic Purkinje cell degeneration (pcd) mice are normal, but instead they have difficulty coordinating their movement. The tracking system dissects movement defects quantitatively to more precisely pinpoint phenotypic defects.

Her group recently uncovered an unexpected link between movement and learning. While examining a type of learning called "eyeblink conditioning" in mice, Carey and her team noticed that the time to condition was highly variable between individuals and difficult to track. They noticed though, that by keeping all animals walking at a similar pace on motorized wheels, the variability diminished and the animals learned the task at a similar rate. Surprisingly, if the animals then started moving at a faster pace, they learned the task quicker.

Carey also studies how changes in walking are learned through cerebellar circuits. To study this, her group built a special "split-belt" treadmill for mice. Using this device, mice learn to modulate their walking so that their front paws and back paws land at the same time, even though each side is moving at a different speed. They discovered that inhibiting neural circuits in the cerebellum, but not the cerebral cortex, was a detriment to learning the walking behavior.

In 2015, she received an ERC starting grant, and in 2020, she received an ERC consolidator grant for her work.

On June 17th, 2025 Carey was awarded with one of the two ERC Advanced Grants and received €2.5M in funding for her research of cerebellar activity during rest and it's involvement in motor memories.

== Scientific activities ==
- Board of Reviewing Editors, eLife (2019–present)
- Neural Control of Movement Society, Board of Directors (2019–present)
- Alba Network: Towards equality and diversity in brain sciences, Executive Council (2018–present)
- The Research, Innovation, and Science Policy Experts (RISE) high-level advisory group to the European Commission, Open Science panel member (2015–2019)
- Gordon Research Conference on the Cerebellum, co-chair (2015–2019)
- FENS-Kavli Network of Excellence, chair (2017–2019)
- FENS Forum (Copenhagen & Berlin), Program Committee Member (2016, 2018)
- Editorial Board member, Scientific Reports (2016–2018)
- COSYNE, co-chair (2016–2017)

== Awards and honors ==
- George H. Acheson & Grass Foundation Prize (top Wesleyan graduate in Neuroscience), 1996
- Krevans Distinguished Dissertation Award, UCSF, 2005
- Helen Hay Whitney Postdoctoral fellowship, 2006
- Harvard University Research Enabling Grant, 2007
- International Early Career Scientist of the Howard Hughes Medical Institute, 2012
- European Research Council Starting Grant 2015
- Scholar, FENS Kavli Network of Excellence, 2016
- European Research Council Consolidator Grant, 2020
