= Patricia Churchland =

Canadian-American philosopher

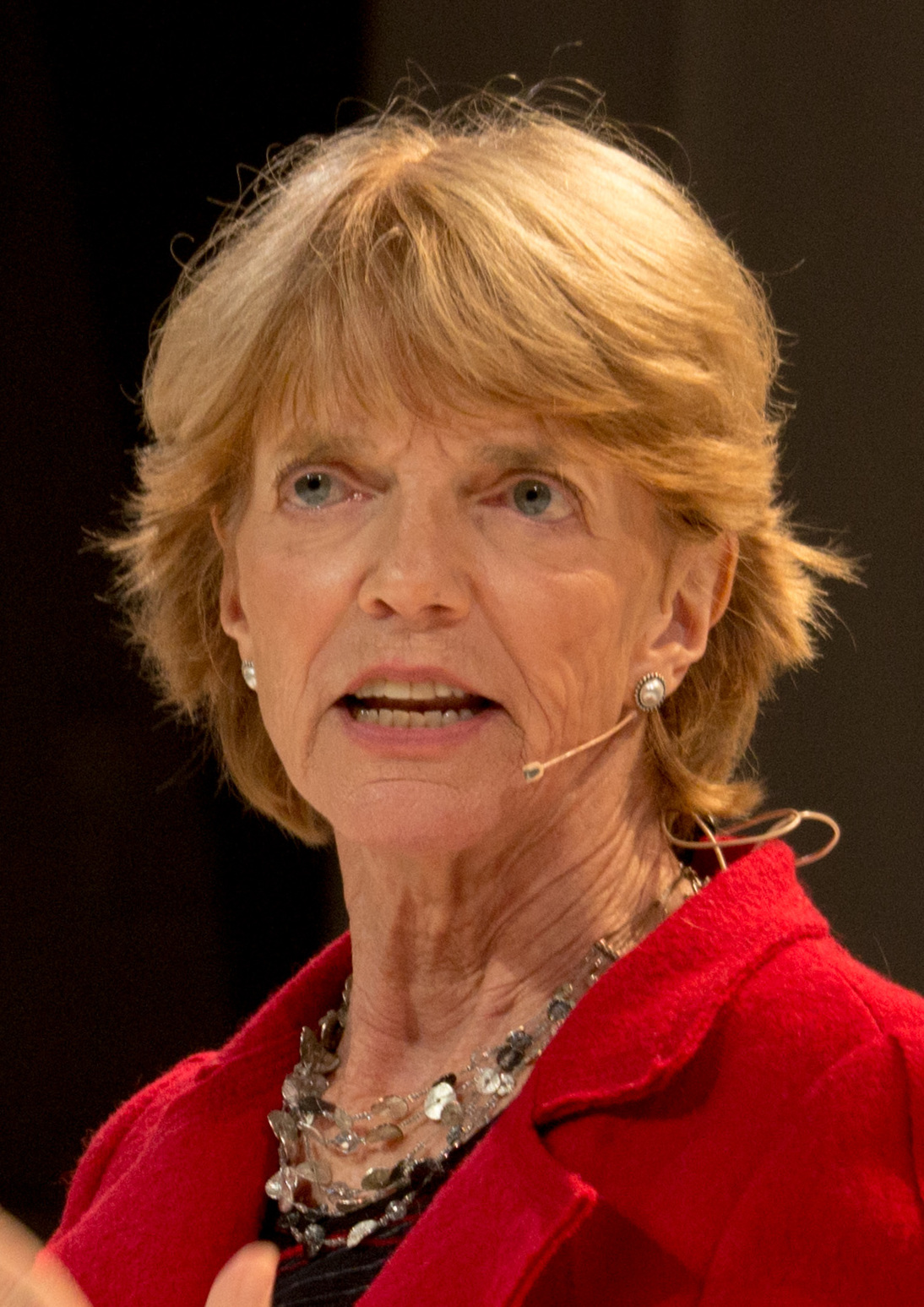
- Born: Patricia Smith; July 16, 1943 (age 83); Oliver, British Columbia, Canada
- Spouse: Paul Churchland (m. 1969)

Education
- Education: University of British Columbia; University of Pittsburgh; Somerville College, Oxford

Philosophical work
- Era: Contemporary philosophy
- Region: Western philosophy
- School: Analytic philosophy
- Institutions: University of Pittsburgh; University of California, San Diego
- Main interests: Philosophy of mind Philosophy of science Medical and environmental ethics
- Notable ideas: Neurophilosophy; Eliminative materialism

Patricia Smith Churchland (born 16 July 1943) is a Canadian-American analytic philosopher noted for her contributions to neurophilosophy and the philosophy of mind. She is UC President's Professor of Philosophy Emerita at the University of California, San Diego (UCSD), where she has taught since 1984. She has also held an adjunct professorship at the Salk Institute for Biological Studies since 1989. She is a member of the Board of Trustees of the Moscow Center for Consciousness Studies of the Philosophy Department, Moscow State University. In 2015, she was elected a Fellow of the American Academy of Arts & Sciences. Educated at the University of British Columbia, the University of Pittsburgh, and Somerville College, Oxford, she taught philosophy at the University of Manitoba from 1969 to 1984 and is married to the philosopher Paul Churchland. Larissa MacFarquhar, writing for The New Yorker, observed of the philosophical couple that: "Their work is so similar that they are sometimes discussed, in journals and books, as one person."

== Biography ==
=== Early life and education ===
Churchland was born Patricia Smith in Oliver, British Columbia, and raised on a farm in the South Okanagan valley. Both of her parents lacked a high-school education; her father and mother left school after grades 6 and 8, respectively. Her mother was a nurse and her father worked in newspaper publishing in addition to running the family farm. In spite of their limited education, Churchland has described her parents as interested in the sciences, and the worldview they instilled in her as a secular one. She has also described her parents as eager for her to attend college, and though many farmers in their community thought this "hilarious and a grotesque waste of money", they saw to it that she did so. She took her undergraduate degree at the University of British Columbia, graduating with honors in 1965. She received a Woodrow Wilson Fellowship to study at the University of Pittsburgh, where she took an M.A. in 1966. Thereafter she studied at Somerville College, Oxford as a British Council and Canada Council Fellow, obtaining a B. Phil in 1969.

=== Academic career ===
Churchland's first academic appointment was at the University of Manitoba, where she was an assistant professor from 1969 to 1977, an associate professor from 1977 to 1982, and promoted to a full professorship in 1983. It was here that she began to make a formal study of neuroscience with the help and encouragement of Larry Jordan, a professor with a lab in the Department of Physiology there. From 1982 to 1983 she was a Visiting Member in Social Science at the Institute for Advanced Study in Princeton. In 1984, she was invited to take up a professorship in the department of philosophy at UCSD, and relocated there with her husband Paul, where both have remained since. Since 1989, she has also held an adjunct professorship at the Salk Institute adjacent to UCSD's campus, where she became acquainted with Jonas Salk whose name the Institute bears. Describing Salk, Churchland has said that he "liked the idea of neurophilosophy, and he gave me a tremendous amount of encouragement at a time when many other people thought that we were, frankly, out to lunch." Another important supporter Churchland found at the Salk Institute was Francis Crick. At the Salk Institute, Churchland has worked with Terrence Sejnowski's lab as a research collaborator. Her collaboration with Sejnowski culminated in a book, The Computational Brain (MIT Press, 1993), co-authored with Sejnowski. Churchland was named the UC President's Professor of Philosophy in 1999, and served as Chair of the Philosophy Department at UCSD from 2000-2007.

She attended and was a speaker at the secularist Beyond Belief symposia in 2006, 2007, and 2008.

== Philosophy ==
Churchland is broadly allied to a view of philosophy as a kind of 'proto-science' - asking challenging but largely empirical questions. She advocates the scientific endeavour, and has dismissed significant swathes of professional philosophy as obsessed with what she regards as unnecessary.

=== Philosophy of mind ===
Churchland's own work has focused on the interface between neuroscience and philosophy. According to her, philosophers are increasingly realizing that to understand the mind one must understand the brain. She applies findings from neuroscience to address traditional philosophical questions about knowledge, free will, consciousness and ethics. She is associated with a school of thought called eliminative materialism, which argues that common sense, immediately intuitive, or "folk psychological" concepts such as thought, free will, and consciousness will likely need to be revised in a physically reductionistic way as neuroscientists discover more about the nature of brain function. 2014 saw a brief exchange of views on these topics with Colin McGinn in the pages of the New York Review Of Books.

== Personal life ==
Churchland first met her husband, the philosopher Paul Churchland, while they were both enrolled in a class on Plato at the University of Pittsburgh, and they were married after she completed her B.Phil at Somerville College, Oxford. Their children are Mark M. Churchland (born 1972) and Anne K. Churchland (born 1974), both of whom are neuroscientists. Churchland is considered an atheist, but she identified herself as pantheist in a 2012 interview.

== Awards and honors ==
- MacArthur Fellowship, 1991
- Humanist Laureate, International Academy of Humanism, 1993
- Honorary Doctor of Letters, University of Virginia, 1996
- Honorary Doctor of Law, University of Alberta, 2007
- Distinguished Cognitive Scientist, UC, Merced Cognitive and Information Sciences program, 2011
- Fellow of the Cognitive Science Society, 2011

== Works ==
=== As sole author ===
- Neurophilosophy: Toward a Unified Science of the Mind-Brain. (1986) Cambridge, Massachusetts: The MIT Press.
- "The Hornswoggle Problem". (1996) San Diego, La Jolla, CA. Journal of Consciousness Studies.
- Brain-Wise: Studies in Neurophilosophy. (2002) Cambridge, Massachusetts: The MIT Press.
- Braintrust: What Neuroscience Tells Us about Morality. (2011) Princeton University Press. eBook ISBN 9781400838080
- Touching A Nerve: The Self As Brain. (2013) W. W. Norton & Company. ISBN 978-0393058321
- Conscience: The Origins of Moral Intuition. (2019) W. W. Norton & Company. ISBN 978-1324000891

=== As co-author or editor ===
- The Computational Brain (1992). Patricia S. Churchland and T. J. Sejnowski. Cambridge, Massachusetts: The MIT Press.
- Neurophilosophy and Alzheimer's Disease (1992). Edited by Y. Christen and Patricia S. Churchland. Berlin: Springer-Verlag.
- The Mind-Brain Continuum (1996). Edited by R.R. Llinás and Patricia S. Churchland: The MIT Press.
- On the Contrary: Critical Essays 1987-1997. (1998). Paul M. Churchland and Patricia S. Churchland. Cambridge, Massachusetts: The MIT Press.

== See also ==
- American philosophy
- Canadian philosophy
- Materialism
- Scientism
