= Aaron Bernstein =

German Jewish writer (1812–1884)

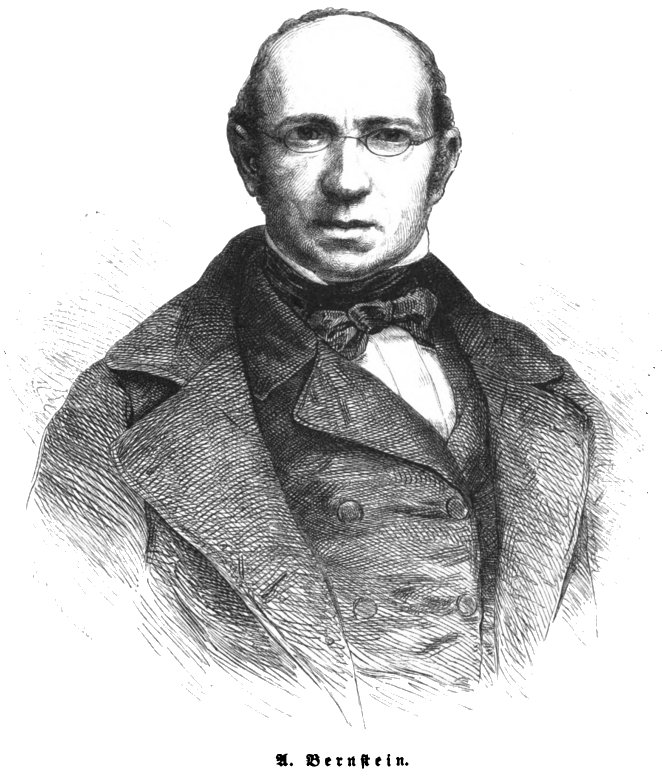
- Born: 6 April 1812; Danzig, Prussia
- Died: 12 February 1884 (aged 71); Berlin, German Empire
- Writing career
- Pen name: A. Rebenstein

Aaron David Bernstein (6 April 1812 – 12 February 1884) was a German Jewish author, reformer and scientist.

== Biography ==
Aaron David Bernstein was born into a Jewish family in Danzig in 1812. He went to Berlin at the age of twenty, where, without any formal education, he immersed himself in the German language and literature. He soon began to write on a wide range of topics. For some years, he worked as an antiquarian book dealer in that city, but his literary pursuits absorbed most of his attention; eventually, he embraced writing as his full-time profession.

Among Bernstein's earliest publications were a translation of the Song of Songs—with critical notes and a bibliographical preface by Leopold Zunz—and Das junge Deutschland ('Young Germany'), which established his reputation as a writer among the literary critics of Berlin.

In the mid-19th century Bernstein took an active role in the movement for synagogue reform in Germany. He was the principal contributor to Wilhelm Freund's monthly periodical, Zur Judenfrage, published in Berlin from July 1843 to June 1844. On March 10, 1845, he was appointed to a committee tasked with formulating a plan for a "line of progress" in Jewish religious affairs. He was entrusted with the task of editing and refining the committee's Entwurf, and was one of the principal authors of the Aufruf that called for the establishment of a religious Reform movement among German Jews, published in Berlin newspapers in early April 1845. He co-authored the prayer book for the newly-organized Reform congregation in Berlin and, although he declined to assume the role of rabbi, he frequently conducted religious services in that capacity until a permanent rabbi was appointed. He was also the editor of the monthly periodical Reform-Zeitung: Organ für den Fortschritt im Judenthum, which appeared in Berlin in 1847.

Bernstein participated in the Revolution of 1848 in Berlin. In 1849, he founded the political monthly Urwählerzeitung, in which he published in 1852 some ultra-democratic articles which led to his imprisonment. The paper was finally suppressed in 1853, and Bernstein established the Volkszeitung, a journal devoted, like its predecessor, largely to the dissemination of democratic views.

== Work ==
=== Literary works ===
Bernstein was one of foremost authors in the genre of Ghetto literature. He was the author of two novels depicting Jewish life, Vögele der Maggid and Mendel Gibbor, initially published in Josef Wertheimer's Jahrbuch für Israeliten and then in book form (Berlin, 1860; 7th edition, ib. 1892). They garnered translations into multiple languages, including Russian (St. Petersburg, 1876). Unlike contemporary ghetto stories, Bernstein's novels were intended for a Jewish audience, and make extensive use of German-Jewish idioms.

=== Political works ===
In 1843, Bernstein authored an anonymous pamphlet titled Zahlen Frappieren in defense of the Prussian Ministry of Finance against an assault by Bülow-Cummerow, generating significant interest within political circles, with some speculating that the minister of finance himself had penned it.

His History of Revolution and Reaction in Prussia and Germany from the Revolution of 1848 up to the present (German: Revolutions- und Reaktionsgeschichte Preussens und Deutschlands von den Märztagen bis zur neuesten Zeit; 3 vols., 1883–4) was a collection of political essays.

=== Scientific works ===
His multivolume book From the Field of Natural Science (German: Aus dem Reiche der Naturwissenschaft; 1853–1856), later republished under the title Popular Books on Natural Science (German: Naturwissenschaftliche Volksbücher; 1880), was frequently reprinted and translated into the principal languages of Europe. A Hebrew translation, entitled Yedi'ot ha-Teva ('Knowledge of Nature'), appeared in Warsaw in 1881-9. This work established Bernstein's reputation as an early popularizer of science.

Already in the edition of 1855, Bernstein published ideas on space, time and the speed of light which had appeared in the anonymous treatise The Stars and the Earth (German: Die Gestirne und die Weltgeschichte) written by 'an unknown clear-sighted thinker.' It was not until 1874 when a new German edition appeared that the name of the author – Felix Eberty – was made public. When this edition was re-published in 1923, Albert Einstein wrote a preface.

A story in volume 16 of Bernstein's Naturwissenschaftliche Volksbücher about riding along with the electricity travelling through a telegraph wire has been credited with inspiring the 16-year-old Albert Einstein to think about travelling along with a beam of light and seeing it stationary. Such thought experiments eventually led to his famous theory of special relativity.

== Family ==
One of his sons was the physiologist Julius Bernstein. He was the uncle of Eduard Bernstein, a Social Democratic theorist and activist.
