= Claudia Clopath =

Neuroscientist

- Education: EPFL (MS, PhD)
- Scientific career
- Workplaces: Columbia University; Paris Descartes University; Imperial College London
- Thesis: Modeling synaptic plasticity across different time scales: the influence of voltage, spike timing, and protein synthesis (2009)
- Doctoral advisor: Wulfram Gerstner

Claudia Clopath is a Professor of Computational Neuroscience at Imperial College London and research leader at the Sainsbury Wellcome Centre for Neural Circuits and Behaviour. She develops mathematical models to predict synaptic plasticity for both medical applications and the design of human-like machines.

== Early life and education ==
Clopath studied physics at École Polytechnique Fédérale de Lausanne. She remained there for her graduate studies, where she worked alongside Wulfram Gerstner. Together they worked on models of spike-timing-dependent plasticity (STPD) that included both the presynaptic and postsynaptic membrane potentials. After earning her PhD she worked as a postdoctoral fellow with Nicolas Brunel at Paris Descartes University. She subsequently joined Columbia University where she worked in the Center for Theoretical Neuroscience.

== Research and career ==
Clopath uses mathematical models to predict synaptic plasticity and to study the implications of synaptic plasticity in artificial neural networks. These models can explain the origins of vibrations in neural networks, and could determine the activities of excitatory and inhibitory neurons. She used this model to explain that inhibitory neurons are important in the determination of the oscillatory frequency of a network. She hopes that the models she generates of the brain will be able to be used in medical applications as well as designing machines that can achieve human-like learning.

She has studied the connections of nerve cells in the visual cortex. The model developed by Clopath, Sandra Sadeh and Stefan Rotter at the Bernstein Center Freiburg was the first to combine biological neural networks in a computational neural network. It allows users to make visual system nerve cells able to detect different features, as well as coordinating the synapses between cells. It can be used to understand how nerve cells develop as they receive information from each eye.

Clopath has worked with DeepMind to create artificial intelligence systems that can be applied to multiple tasks, making them able to remember information or master a series of steps. Together Clopath and DeepMind used synaptic consolidation, a mechanism that allows neural networks to remember. The algorithm, Elastic Weight Consolidation, can compute how important different connections in a neural network are, and apply a weighting factor that dictates its importance. This determines the rate at which values of a node within the neural network are altered. They demonstrated that software that used Elastic Weight Consolidation could learn and achieve human-level performance in ten games. Developing machine learning systems for continual learning tasks has become the focus of Clopath's research, using computational models in recurrent neural networks to establish how inhibition gates synaptic plasticity.

In 2015 she was awarded a Google Faculty Research Award.

== Selected publications ==
- Clopath, Claudia; Vasilaki, Eleni; Gerstner, Wulfram (2010). "Connectivity reflects coding: a model of voltage-based STDP with homeostasis". Nature Neuroscience. 13 (3): 344–352. doi:10.1038/nn.2479. hdl:10044/1/21440. PMID 20098420. S2CID 8046538.
- Vogels, Tim; Sprekeler, Henning; Zenke, Friedemann; Clopath, Claudia; Gerstner, Wulfram (2011). "Inhibitory Plasticity Balances Excitation and Inhibition in Sensory Pathways and Memory Networks". Science. 334 (6062): 1569–1573. Bibcode:2011Sci...334.1569V. doi:10.1126/science.1211095. hdl:10044/1/21441. PMID 22075724. S2CID 45134325.
- Ko, Ho; Cossell, Lee; Baragli, Chiara; Antolik, Jan; Clopath, Claudia; Hofer, Sonja B.; Mrsic-Flogel, Thomas D. (2013). "The emergence of functional microcircuits in visual cortex". Nature. 496 (7443): 96–100. Bibcode:2013Natur.496...96K. doi:10.1038/nature12015. PMC 4843961. PMID 23552948.
