= David G. Drubin =

American biologist, academic, and researcher

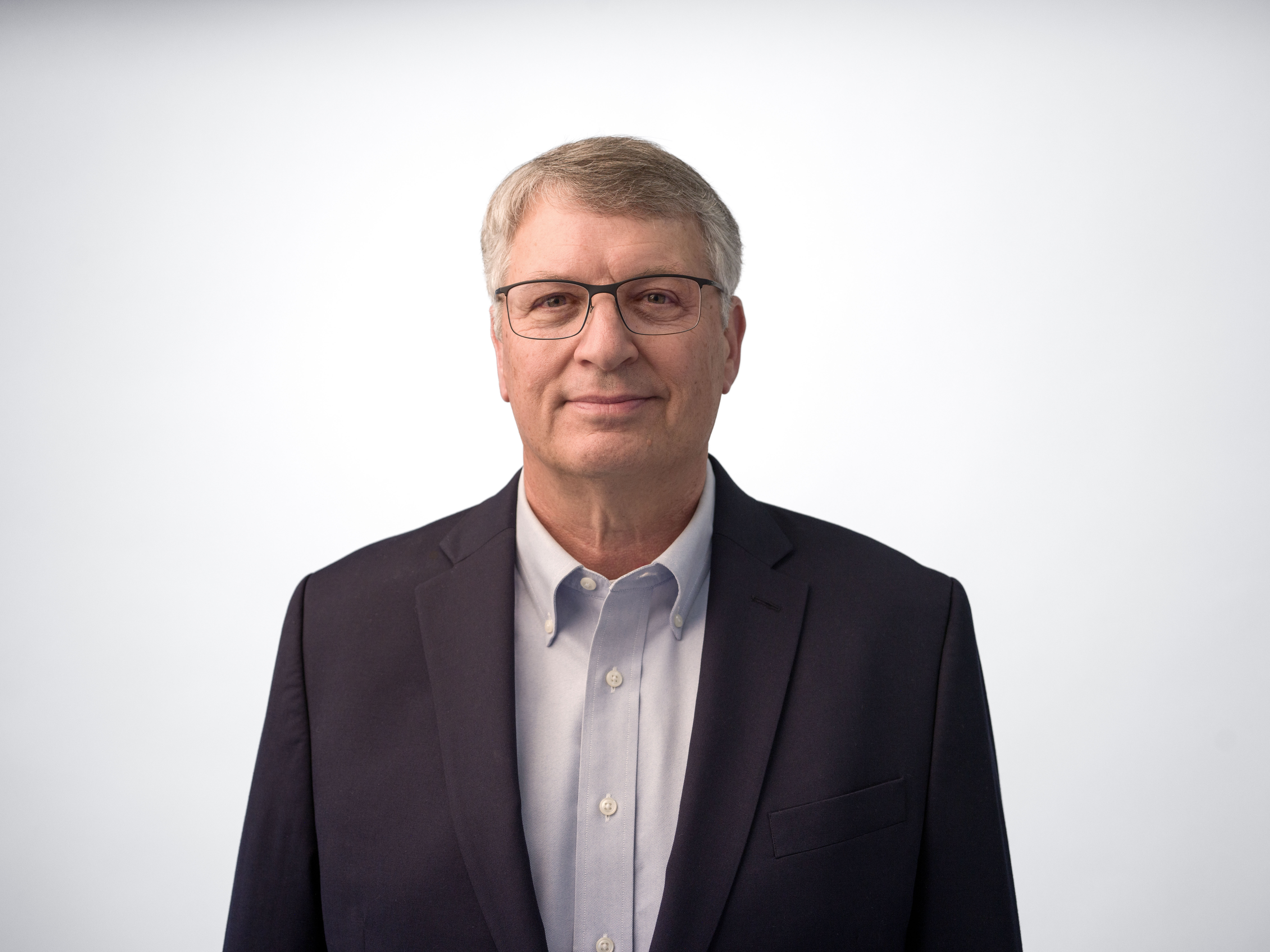
- Occupations: Biologist, Academic, and Researcher
- Awards: Member, National Academy of Sciences; MERIT Award, National Institutes of Health; Ira Herskowitz Award, Yeast Genetics and Molecular Biology Meeting; Member, American Academy of Arts and Sciences; SPARC Innovator Award for SF Declaration on Research Assessment; Lifetime Achievement Fellow, American Society for Cell Biology; Distinguished Service Award, American Society for Cell Biology

Academic background
- Education: A.B., Biochemistry; Ph.D., Biochemistry and Biophysics
- Alma mater: University of California, Berkeley (A.B.); University of California, San Francisco (PhD with Marc Kirschner); Massachusetts Institute of Technology (postdoc with David Botstein)

Academic work
- Institutions: University of California, Berkeley

David G. Drubin is an American biologist, academic, and researcher. He is a Distinguished Professor of Cell and Developmental Biology at the University of California, Berkeley where he holds the Ernette Comby Chair in Microbiology. Drubin is known for his work elucidating the molecular mechanisms of cytoskeletal dynamics, actin assembly, and clathrin‑mediated endocytosis using both genetically tractable model organisms and genome‑edited human stem cells. His research has influenced understanding of how cells convert chemical energy into mechanical force during endocytosis and other dynamic cellular processes. Drubin has published over 220 peer‑reviewed scientific articles, with around 40,000 citations and a D‑Index exceeding 100.

He is a Fellow of American Society for Cell Biology, and was a Senior Fellow at the Allen Institute for Cell Science. He served as Editor-in-Chief for Molecular Biology of the Cell for 10 years, advocating for civil and constructive peer review. At the 2012 ASCB annual meeting in San Francisco he organized a meeting of journal editors to discuss the harmful effects of the Journal Impact Factor. This meeting produced the San Francisco Declaration on Research Assessment and earned the leaders of the effort SPARC Innovator Award recognition.

He was elected a member of the National Academy of Sciences in 2022.

== Early life and education ==
Drubin was born in Tarrytown, New York, and grew up in Massachusetts, Michigan, and California. He earned a Bachelor of Arts in biochemistry from the University of California, Berkeley in 1980, where he studied B. subtilis RNA polymerase under Michael J. Chamberlin, and a Ph.D. in biochemistry and biophysics from the University of California, San Francisco in 1985, where he studied microtubule-associated tau protein under Marc Kirschner.

Drubin was awarded a Helen Hay Whitney Postdoctoral Fellowship to work in David Botstein's laboratory at the Massachusetts Institute of Technology from 1985 to 1988. There he began his lifelong focus on the actin cytoskeleton in the budding yeast Saccharomyces cerevisiae.

== Career ==
In 1988, Drubin was appointed Assistant Professor of Molecular and Cell Biology at the University of California, Berkeley. He was promoted to Associate Professor in 1994 and to Professor in 1998. At Berkeley, he has served in several administrative roles, including Head of the Molecular and Cell Biology Graduate Program, Head of the Division of Cell and Developmental Biology, and Co‑Chair of the Department of Molecular and Cell Biology.

== Research ==
Drubin's research utilizes live-cell imaging, genetics, modeling and biochemistry to address fundamental questions concerning the cytoskeleton and membrane trafficking events in budding yeast and genome-edited human stem cells.

=== Molecular and cell biology ===
While isolating the gene encoding microtubule-associated tau protein, a major player in Alzheimer's disease, Drubin developed cell culture models to study its biological function. He distilled general principles for cell polarity development while defining it as the ultimate reflection of complex mechanisms that establish and maintain functionally specialized domains in the plasma membrane and cytoplasm. In a paper published in 2001, he guided establishment of a protein interaction map for cell polarity development, and determined a network of interactions that provide an integrated response of signaling proteins, the cytoskeleton, and organelles to the spatial cues that direct polarity development.

=== Membrane trafficking and the cytoskeleton ===
Drubin studied mutants of over 60 proteins, identifying a pathway in budding yeast in which proteins are recruited to endocytic sites, and also identified several protein modules that provide distinct functions in this pathway. He extended these studies to mammalian cells, and determined the roles of these proteins in endocytosis and cell polarity development. In the early 2000s, he outlined examples of functional cooperation between the microtubule and actin cytoskeletons, and highlighted two broad categories in this context: coordinated MT- and actin-based transport to move vesicles, organelles, and cell fate determinants; and targeting and capture of MT ends at cortical actin sites.

=== Actin assembly ===
A central theme of Drubin's work has been revealing how actin filaments are assembled and regulated in vivo. He demonstrated that actin filaments turn over rapidly in yeast cells and showed that cofilin is critical for facilitating this turnover. His lab performed structure‑function analyses of actin and critical regulators such as profilin, Arp2/3 complex components, and novel actin nucleation factors.

Drubin's group also developed extract‑based systems to reconstitute complex actin assembly events in vitro, enabling precise dissection of the mechanisms by which actin networks generate force and organize spatially distinct actin structures. These reconstituted systems have served as models for understanding how actin assembly drives processes such as vesicle formation.

=== Clathrin‑mediated endocytosis ===
One of Drubin's contributions is the mechanistic dissection of clathrin‑mediated endocytosis (CME). Using two‑color real‑time fluorescence microscopy and rigorous genetic analysis in yeast, his lab elucidated a stereotyped sequence in which >60 proteins are recruited to endocytic sites and orchestrated to drive membrane invagination and vesicle scission.

His group brought these insights into mammalian cells by using genome editing to label proteins in their natural context, allowing them to watch endocytosis in real time. This work showed that protein recruitment follows a conserved order across species and clarified how actin helps reshape the membrane. Drubin and his team also developed models of how actin networks organize and adapt under pressure. A 2020 study measured exactly how Arp2/3 complexes arrange themselves at endocytic sites to define the principles behind this process.

== Professional service ==
Drubin has served the National Institutes of Health as a grant reviewer and in other capacities and committees of scientific societies. He has organized and chaired program committees for major meetings such as the ASCB annual conference and the Gordon Research Conference on the Plant and Fungal Cytoskeleton.

== Awards/honors ==
- 1985-1988 - Helen Hay Whitney Postdoctoral Fellowship
- 1990-1993 - Searle Scholar Award
- 1994-1999 - Faculty Research Award, American Cancer Society
- 2006-2016 - MERIT Award, National Institutes of Health
- 2008 - Ira Herskowitz Award, Yeast Genetics and Molecular Biology Meeting
- 2010 - Election to the American Academy of Arts and Sciences
- 2013 - SPARC Innovator Award for SF Declaration on Research Assessment
- 2016 - Awarded Ernette Comby Chair in Microbiology, UC Berkeley
- 2016 - Lifetime Achievement Fellow, American Society for Cell Biology
- 2019 - Distinguished Service Award, American Society for Cell Biology
- 2022 - Election to the National Academy of Sciences
- 2023 - Keith R. Porter Lecture Award, American Society for Cell Biology

== Bibliography ==
- Drubin, D. G., & Kirschner, M. W. (1986). Tau protein function in living cells. Journal of Cell Biology, 103(6), 2739–2746.
- Drubin, D. G., & Nelson, W. J. (1996). Origins of cell polarity. Cell, 84(3), 335–344.
- Ayscough, K. R., Stryker, J., Pokala, N., Sanders, M., Crews, P., & Drubin, D. G. (1997). High rates of actin filament turnover in budding yeast and roles for actin in establishment and maintenance of cell polarity revealed using the actin inhibitor latrunculin-A. Journal of Cell biology, 137(2), 399–416.
- Kaksonen M., Sun Y., Drubin D.G., (2003). A pathway for association of receptors, adaptors and actin during endocytic internalization Cell 115(4): 475–87.
- Kaksonen M., Toret C.P., Drubin D.G., (2005). A modular design for the clathrin- and actin-mediated endocytosis machinery. Cell 123: 305–320.
- Doyon J.B., Zeitler B., Cheng J., Cheng A.T., Cherone J.M., Santiago Y., Lee A.H., Vo T.D., Doyon Y., Miller J.C., Paschon D.E., Zhang L., Rebar E.J., Gregory P.D., Urnov F.D., & Drubin D.G. (2011). Rapid and efficient clathrin-mediated endocytosis revealed in genome-edited mammalian cells. Nat Cell Biol 13(3): 331–7.

== Externals links ==
- David G. Drubin on PubMed
