= Bernstein Network =

Computational neuroscience research network

The Bernstein Network is a research network in the field of computational neuroscience; this field brings together experimental approaches in neurobiology with theoretical models and computer simulations. It unites different scientific disciplines, such as physics, biology, mathematics, medical science, psychology, computer science, engineering and philosophy in the endeavor to understand how the brain functions. The close combination of neurobiological experiments with theoretical models and computer simulations allows scientists of the Bernstein Network to pursue innovative approaches with regard to one of the most complex structures nature has created in the course of evolution: the natural brain.

The network started in 2004 with a funding initiative of the Federal Ministry of Education and Research (BMBF) to develop and interconnect research structures in computational neuroscience throughout Germany and to promote the transfer of theoretical insight into clinical and technical applications.

It is named after the German physiologist and biophysicist Julius Bernstein (1839–1917). His "membrane hypothesis" provided the first biophysical explanation of how nerve cells transmit and process information via electrical currents. Generating a mathematical description, he also paved the way to simulate neural brain processes in the computer. Today, the Bernstein Network consists of more than 200 research groups worldwide.

== History ==
In 2004, the Bernstein Network started off as the "Nationales Bernstein Netzwerk Computational Neuroscience" (NNCN) as a funding initiative of the Federal Ministry of Education and Research (BMBF). The aim of the initiative was the long-term establishment of the research discipline Computational Neuroscience in Germany. As part of the high-tech strategy of the German government, the Bernstein Network has been supported with a total of about 170 million euros until now. The network includes over 200 research groups at more than 25 locations nationwide. The participating research groups were located at universities and non-university research institutes (Fraunhofer, Helmholtz, Leibniz and Max Planck institutes). Using a BMBF initial financing, 22 new professorships in the area of Computational Neuroscience were established at German universities within the framework of the Bernstein Network, which were cnsoblidated by the federal states.

Scientific members of the network were involved in study programs and courses and collaborated with numerous industry partners to develop specific biomedical or technological applications (e.g. brain computer interface, retinal implant, cochlear implant, prosthesis, advanced driver-assistance systems, neuromorphic chips). They also worked (and still do) on new diagnostic methods, therapeutic approaches, or tools for neurological or psychiatric disorders in collaboration with clinical researchers (e.g. epilepsy, tinnitus, amyotrophic lateral sclerosis, Parkinson's disease, stroke, depression, schizophrenia).

== Structure ==
Six Bernstein Centers (in Berlin, Freiburg, Göttingen, Heidelberg-Mannheim, Munich and Tübingen) form the basic structure of the Bernstein Network. As additional local structural elements, five Bernstein groups have been established (in Bochum, Bremen, Heidelberg, Jena, and Magdeburg). Eleven Bernstein Collaborations link the Bernstein Centers with diverse research groups widely distributed over Germany. Since 2006, the BMBF has annually allocated the Bernstein Award to an outstanding young scientist in the research field of Computational Neuroscience. The award is endowed with up to 1,25 million euros over five years, and allows to establish an independent junior research group at a German research institution.

Since 2008 and 2009, respectively, the Bernstein Network comprehends two research foci, which explore the first steps towards applications. The Bernstein Focus: Neurotechnology includes 4 local collaborative projects (in Berlin, Göttingen, Frankfurt and Freiburg-Tübingen); the Bernstein Focus: Neuronal Basis of Learning comprises eight collaborative projects.

== Integration into the international research landscape ==
The German INCF Node (G-Node) connects the Bernstein Network with the international network of the International Neuroinformatics Coordinating Facility.

Since 2010, the BMBF promotes German-American cooperation projects in the field of computational neuroscience within the framework of the Bernstein Network and the CRCNS program in cooperation with the National Science Foundation (NSF) and the National Institutes of Health (NIH). In a cooperation between the BMBF, German Research Foundation (DFG), and the Japan Science and Technology Agency (JST), German-Japan Collaboration projects have been launched in 2012.

== Bernstein Conference ==
The Bernstein Conference is the largest annual Computational Neuroscience conference in Europe attracting an international audience from across the world. Until 2017, it was organized by members of the Bernstein Network at annually changing locations. In the years 2018 - 2022, the Bernstein Conferences takes place in Berlin. The conference offers a broad overview over the topics of Computational Neuroscience and Neurotechnology.

== Membership ==
In 2009, members of the Bernstein Network founded a non-profit association, the Bernstein Association Computational Neuroscience, aiming at promoting science, research, and teaching in Computational Neuroscience and the communication of research contents and results to the public. The Bernstein Network Computational Neuroscience is open to all researchers in the field or related subjects. Individual membership must be supported by two active Bernstein members. Further information.

== Literature ==
- Peter Dayan, Larry F. Abbott: "Theoretical neuroscience: computational and mathematical modeling of neural systems". MIT Press, Cambridge, Mass 2001, ISBN 0-262-04199-5.
- William Bialek, Fred Rieke, David Warland, Rob de Ruyter van Steveninck: "Spikes: exploring the neural code". MIT Press, Cambridge, Mass 1999, ISBN 0-262-68108-0.
- David Sterratt, Bruce Graham, Andrew Gillies, David Willshaw: "Principles of Computational Modelling in Neuroscience". Cambridge University Press, 2011, ISBN 978-0521877954
- Sonja Grün, Stefan Rotter (eds.): „Analysis of Parallel Spike Trains“, Springer Series in Computational Neuroscience, 2010. ISBN 978-1441956743
- Hanspeter A. Mallot: "Computational Neuroscience: A first course", Springer Series in Bio-/Neuroinformatics, 2013. ISBN 978-3319008608
- James M. Bower (ed.): "20 years of Computational Neuroscience", Springer Series in Computational Neuroscience, 2013. ISBN 978-1461414230

== Links ==
- Website of the Bernstein Network Computational Neuroscience
- Website of the Bernstein Conference
- German Neuroinformatics Node of the INCF (G-Node)
- International Neuroinformatics Coordinating Facility (INCF)
