= Jessica Cardin =

American neuroscientist

- Education: Cornell University, University of Pennsylvania
- Known for: Combined optogenetics and electrophysiology, behavioral state dependency of cortical neural circuit function
- Scientific career
- Fields: Neuroscience
- Workplaces: Yale School of Medicine

Jessica Cardin is an American neuroscientist who is an associate professor of neuroscience at Yale University School of Medicine. Cardin's lab studies local circuits within the primary visual cortex to understand how cellular and synaptic interactions flexibly adapt to different behavioral states and contexts to give rise to visual perceptions and drive motivated behaviors. Cardin's lab applies its knowledge of adaptive cortical circuit regulation to probe how circuit dysfunction manifests in disease models.

== Early life and education ==
In grade nine, she conducted an experiment in her house, using mice as a model organism to probe sex based differences in learning. Cardin pursued her undergraduate degree at Cornell University in Ithaca, New York where she majored in biological sciences and started conducting research in a real laboratory, instead of her own home. At Cornell, Cardin joined the lab of Timothy J. DeVoogd, where she studied learning in songbirds and mapped out the morphology and anatomy of the high vocal center (HVC) in female canaries. Her undergraduate research led to a publication in Brain Research where she helped to adapt a technique to morphologically define specific projection pathways to the high vocal center (HVC). They describe their discovery of neurons projecting to AreaX that receive direct auditory input to support the function of the HVC in song learning.

After graduating with a B.A. from Cornell in 1997, Cardin pursued her graduate studies in neuroscience at the University of Pennsylvania. Once at UPenn, Cardin rotated in the lab of Ted Abel, a new faculty member at the time, studying the molecular basis of memory storage. During her rotation, Cardin helped Abel write a review paper exploring the memory suppression both in invertebrates and vertebrates. In 2000, Cardin joined the lab of Marc Schmidt where she returned to the model organism used in her undergraduate degree, songbirds, but this time she probed the behavioral state dependency of auditory processing in songbird neural circuits.

Cardin completed her PhD training in 2004 and stayed in Philadelphia to complete her postdoctoral fellowship in the Department of Neuroscience at the UPenn Medical School. Working under the mentorship of Diego Contreras, Cardin delved into electrophysiology, where she was able to record neural activity at single cell resolution in the visual cortex of cats to probe the dynamics of visual cortex computations. She completed her postdoctoral training in 2009, but from 2007 to 2009, Cardin trained simultaneously under Christopher I. Moore at the Massachusetts Institute of Technology within the McGovern Institute where she began to pioneer new applications of optogenetics to probing and recording from neural circuits.

=== Research ===
During her graduate studies, Cardin explored the variability in sensory processing across brain states, such as during sedation, wakefulness, and high arousal. She found that behavioral states drastically influence the neural firing patterns of auditory neurons. While songbirds are asleep, the neurons in the HVC increase in firing, with selectivity towards the birds own song, while when songbirds are awake, there is much more variability in firing and there is no longer selectivity towards the bird's own song. They further found that arousal suppressed the responsiveness of the HVC which suggests that other mechanisms must be at play to enhance auditory responsiveness in awake states.

After discovering that the HVC is modulated according to behavioral state, Cardin then found that an upstream brain area, called the nucleus interfacialis (NiF) is also modulated by behavioral state. By pharmacologically inhibiting and exciting the NiF, Cardin found that the NiF is the primary integration site of behavioral state information and it relays this information to the HVC to drive its responsiveness to behavioral state. Following this study, Cardin showed that specifically the noradrenergic neurons in the NiF are what mediate NiF neuron responsiveness to brain state. Overall, Cardin's findings in graduate school highlight the noradrenergic neurons in the NiF as the critical integrators of brain state to relay state information during vocal learning in songbirds.

In her postdoctoral work, Cardin explored gamma oscillations in the primary visual cortex of cats. She explored both simple and complex cells in the primary visual cortex and found that, while they both burst at gamma frequencies, only simple cells show a selective stimulus feature-dependent response to visual stimulation. Since rhythmic synaptic input drives visually evoked activity in both simple and complex fast rhythmic bursting cells of the visual cortex, Cardin proposes that these cells may distribute stimulus driven gamma oscillations throughout the neocortex.

Following this paper, Cardin and her team validated the existence of gain modulation in the primary visual cortex. Gain modulation is a neural phenomenon in which response amplitude is modified without changing selectivity. Cardin and her team performed intracellular recordings in the cat primary visual cortex and found that gain modulation is determined instantaneously by the rapidly changing sensory context and the dynamics of synaptic activation.

After focusing on the visual system, Cardin conducted a brief postdoctoral position at M.I.T. where she learned optogenetics and employed the technology in novel ways to further the findings she had made previously in her postdoc at UPenn. Cardin helped elucidate experimental support for the fast-spiking gamma hypothesis. They found that fast-spiking interneurons had amplified gamma oscillations when driven at frequencies between 8 and 200 Hz through optogenetic manipulation. They further showed this was not the case for pyramidal neurons, whose neural activity is amplified at low frequencies. Overall, they showed that network activity states can be driven in vivo using cell-type specific optogenetics. Following this paper, Cardin and a team of researchers developed a protocol to both stimulate neurons optogenetically and record evoked activity in vivo using electrophysiological preparations. Their technology enabled researchers to ask questions about the roles of specific neural populations in the brain at much greater specificity than ever before.

== Career ==
In 2010, Cardin was recruited to Yale University School of Medicine and became an assistant professor in the Department of Neurobiology. In 2012, she became a member of the Kavli Institute for Neuroscience at Yale. Cardin's lab probes cortical neural circuits to understand how cellular and synaptic interactions flexibly adapt to different behavioral states and environmental contexts to give rise to visual perceptions and drive motivated behaviors. Cardin's lab further applies their knowledge of adaptive cortical circuit regulation to probe how circuit dysfunction manifests in disease models. In addition to her roles in the lab, Cardin is on the Brain Science Mindscope Advisory Council as an Allen Institute Advisor and has been integrally involved in the organization and planning of the COSYNE Conference since 2009.

=== Functional Flexibility in Neural Circuits ===
Cardin is interested in understanding how the brain can function without needing more neurons, specialized to specific behavioral states. Because neurons are able to so quickly respond and adapt to different environments and arousal states, Cardin and her team explored the neural activity governing transitions between distinct waking states. Heightened arousal states, compared to quiescent states, suppressed spontaneous neural firing and increased the signal to noise ratio of visual responses. Their findings pointed to the distinct behavior of neurons in different states and that the malleable activity patterns in cortical circuits are driven by both arousal state and locomotion in different ways.

Following this study, Cardin and her team used in vivo calcium imaging to look at three distinct populations of projection neurons in the visual cortex to determine if they encoded and transferred unique information to downstream structures about the visual environment. They found that specific projection populations process and route visual information to downstream targets in functionally different ways to inform behavior.

Cardin and her team recently probed the role of vasoactive intestinal peptide (VIP) expressing interneurons in cortical neural circuit regulation. By removing a critical signalling receptor, ErbB4, from VIP neurons, Cardin and her team saw deficits in sensory processing and dysregulation of cortical state dependence they had shown was important to cortical function in earlier experiments. Interestingly, the dysregulation in neural circuit function manifested in adolescence, even though ErbB4 was removed in development, suggesting that developmental aberrations in cortical circuit development might not present until later in life, mimicking the prognosis of many brain-related diseases and shedding insight into their possibly developmental origins.

== Awards and honors ==
- 2018 Allen Institute Distinguished Seminar Series
- 2015 Smith Family Award for Excellence in Biomedical Research
- 2014 McKnight Scholar Award
- 2012 Alfred P. Sloan Fellowship
- 2011 NARSAD Young Investigator Award
- 2010 Klingenstein Fellowship Award in Neuroscience
- 2005 Kirschtein Individual Postdoctoral NRSA Research Fellowship
- 2004 Flexner Award for Outstanding Neuroscience Dissertation Research - University of Pennsylvania
- 1996 Howard Hughes Undergraduate Scholar - Cornell University

== Select publications ==
- Miri ML, Vinck M, Pant R, Cardin J. Altered hippocampal interneuron activity precedes ictal onset. Elife. 7. PMID 30387711 DOI: 10.7554/eLife.40750
- Batista-Brito, R.*, Vinck, M.*, Ferguson, K.A., Chang, J., Laubender D., Lur, G., Ramakrishnan, C., Deisseroth K., Higley, M.J., and Cardin, J.A. Developmental Dysfunction of VIP Interneurons Impairs Cortical Circuits. Neuron 2017, 95:884-95. *Co-first authors.
- Cardin, J.A. Snapshots of the brain in action: Local circuit interactions through the lens of gamma oscillations. J Neurosci 2016, 36:10496-10504.
- Vinck, M.*, Batista-Brito, R.*, Knoblich, U., Cardin, J.A. Arousal and locomotion make distinct contributions to cortical activity patterns and visual encoding. Neuron 2015, 86,740-54. *Co-first authors
- Cardin, J.A. Dissecting local circuits in vivo: Integrated optogenetic and electrophysiology approaches for exploring inhibitory regulation of cortical activity. J Physiol Paris 2012, 106, 104–11.
- Cardin, J.A., E.M. Carlén, K. Meletis, U. Knoblich, F. Zhang, K. Deisseroth, L.H. Tsai, and C.I. Moore. Targeted optogenetic stimulation and recording of neurons in vivo using cell type-specific expression of Channelrhodopsin-2. Nature Protocols 2010, 5:247-254.
- Cardin, J.A., E.M. Carlén, K. Meletis, U. Knoblich, F. Zhang, K. Deisseroth, L.H. Tsai, and C.I. Moore. Driving fast-spiking cells induces gamma rhythm and controls sensory responses. Nature 2009, 459:663-7.
- Cardin, J.A., L.A. Palmer, and D. Contreras. Cellular mechanisms underlying stimulus-dependent gain modulation in primary visual cortex neurons. Neuron 2008, 59:150-160.
- Cardin, J.A., L.A. Palmer, and D. Contreras. Stimulus-dependent gamma (30–50 Hz) oscillations in simple and complex Fast Rhythmic Bursting cells in primary visual cortex. J Neurosci 2005, 25:5339-50.
- Cardin, J.A., and M.F. Schmidt. Auditory responses in multiple sensorimotor song system nuclei are co-modulated by behavioral state. J Neurophysiol 2004, 91:2148-63.
- Cardin, J.A., and M.F. Schmidt. Noradrenergic inputs mediate state dependence of auditory responses in the avian song system. J Neurosci 2004, 24:7745-53.
- Cardin, J.A., and M.F. Schmidt. Song system auditory responses are stable and highly tuned during sedation, rapidly modulated and unselective during wakefulness, and suppressed by arousal. J Neurophysiol 2003, 90: 2884–2899.
- Cardin, J.A. and T. Abel. Memory suppressor genes: enhancing the relationship between synaptic plasticity and memory storage. J Neurosci Res 1999, 58:10-23.
- Benton, S, J.A. Cardin, and T.J. DeVoogd. Lucifer Yellow filling of area X-projecting neurons in the high vocal center of female canaries. Brain Research 1998, 799:138-147.
