= Julius Bernstein =

German physiologist (1839–1917)

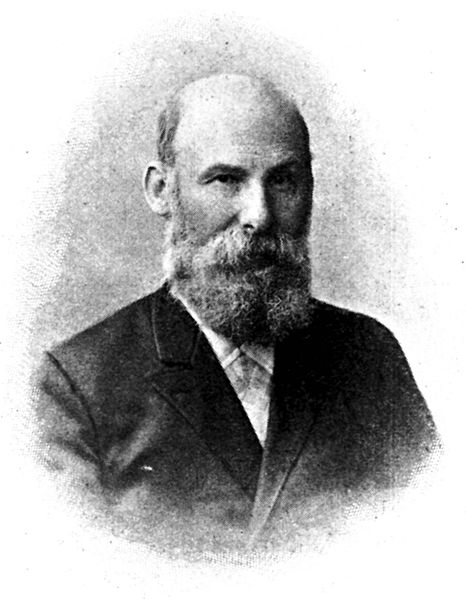
Julius Bernstein

Julius Bernstein (18 December 1839 – 6 February 1917) was a German physiologist born in Berlin. His father was Aaron Bernstein (1812–1884), a founder of the Reform Judaism Congregation in Berlin 1845; his son was the mathematician Felix Bernstein (1878–1956).

== Academic career ==
He studied medicine at the University of Breslau under Rudolf Heidenhain (1834–1897), and at the University of Berlin with Emil Du Bois-Reymond (1818–1896). He received his medical degree at Berlin in 1862, and two years later began work in the physiological institute at the University of Heidelberg as an assistant to Hermann von Helmholtz (1821–1894). In 1872 he succeeded Friedrich Goltz (1834–1902) as professor of physiology at the University of Halle, where in 1881 he founded an institute of physiology.

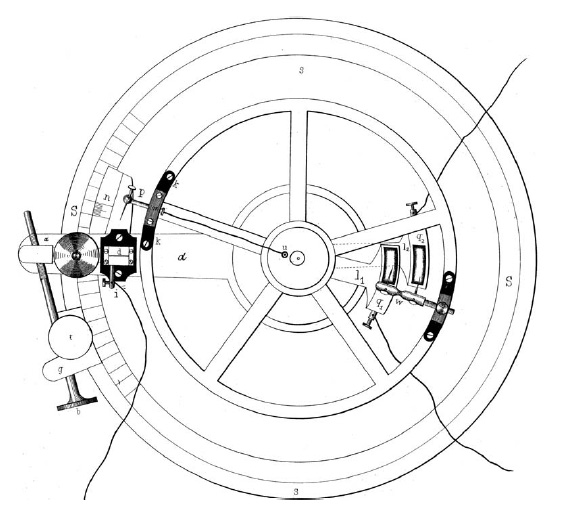
Differential rheotome, used by Bernstein to measure action potentials

== Contributions ==
Bernstein's work was concentrated in the fields of neurobiology and biophysics. He is largely recognized for his "membrane hypothesis" in regards to the origin of the "resting potential" and the "action potential" in the nerve. Bernstein (1902, 1912) correctly proposed that excitable cells are surrounded by a membrane selectively permeable to K^{+} ions at rest and that during excitation the membrane permeability to other ions increases. His "membrane hypothesis" explained the resting potential of nerve and muscle as a diffusion potential set up by the tendency of positively charged ions to diffuse from their high concentration in cytoplasm to their low concentration in the extracellular solution while other ions are held back. During excitation, the internal negativity would be lost transiently as other ions are allowed to diffuse across the membrane, effectively short-circuiting the K^{+} diffusion potential. In the English-language literature, the words "membrane breakdown" were used to describe Bernstein's view of excitation. (From Ion Channels of Excitable Membranes, Third Edition, by Bertil Hille).

Bernstein's pioneering research laid the groundwork for experimentation on the conduction of the nerve impulse, and eventually the transmission of information in the nervous system. He is credited with invention of a "differential rheotome", a device used to measure the velocity of bio-electric impulses. The German Bernstein Network Computational Neuroscience has been named after him.

== Written works ==
- Untersuchungen über den Erregungsvorgang im Nerven- und Muskelsysteme, Heidelberg: Winter, 1871 - Experiments on the excitation process in nerve and muscle systems.
- Die fünf Sinne des Menschen, Leipzig: Brockhaus, 1875 - The five senses of humans.
- Die mechanische Theorie des Lebens, ihre Grundlagen und ihre Erfolge. Braunschweig: Vieweg, 1890 - The mechanical theory of life, etc.
- Lehrbuch der Physiologie des thierischen Organismus, im speciellen des Menschen. Stuttgart: F. Enke, 1894 - Textbook of physiology on the "animal organism", etc.
- Elektrobiologie: Die Lehre von den elektrischen Vorgängen im Organismus auf moderner Grundlage dargestellt. Braunschweig: Vieweg, 1912 - Book on electrobiology (Treatise that provided the first quantitative theory of nerve and muscle action based on solid experimentation, precise measurements and the use of biophysical models).

== See also ==
- Bioelectrochemistry
