= Rachel Wilson (Quaker minister) =

English Quaker minister (1720–1775)

Rachel Wilson (8 April 1720 – 18 March 1775) was an English Quaker minister from Kendal, Cumbria, who travelled extensively in Britain and the Thirteen Colonies.

Her great, great, great, great-grandson, Geoffrey Braithwaite, published a book based on her three-volume diary, titled Rachel Wilson and her Quaker Mission in Eighteenth Century America (2012, York: Sessions Books, ISBN 978-1850724124).

A typed transcript of her diary is held in the Haverford College Quaker & Special Collections of Haverford College in Pennsylvania, United States.
