= Eero Simoncelli =

American computational neuroscientist

- Citizenship: American
- Education: Harvard University; Cambridge University; MIT
- Known for: Steerable pyramid SSIM; Bayesian models of perception Texture models Image priors
- Awards: IEEE Fellow (2009); Primetime Engineering Emmy (2015); Golden Brain Award (2016); AAAS (2019)
- Scientific career
- Fields: Computational neuroscience Computational vision Visual perception Image Processing
- Workplaces: University of Pennsylvania; New York University
- Thesis: Distributed Representation and Analysis of Visual Motion (1993)
- Doctoral advisor: Edward Adelson
- Doctoral students: Liam Paninski

Eero Simoncelli is an American computational neuroscientist and Silver Professor at New York University. He was a Howard Hughes Medical Institute Investigator from 2000 to 2020. In 2020, he became the inaugural director of the Center for Computational Neuroscience at the Flatiron Institute of the Simons Foundation.

== Education and early career ==
Simoncelli graduated summa cum laude with a bachelor's degree in physics at Harvard University in 1984. He then attended Cambridge University on a Knox Fellowship to study the Mathematical Tripos, after which he joined the graduate program at the Massachusetts Institute of Technology in electrical engineering and computer science. He received his master's degree in 1988 and his PhD in 1993. He then joined the faculty at the University of Pennsylvania as an assistant professor, and in 1996 he moved to New York University.

== Awards and professional recognition ==
In 2009, he became an IEEE Fellow. He received an Engineering Emmy Award in 2015 with Zhou Wang, Alan Bovik, and Hamid Sheikh for the Structural Similarity Video Quality Measurement Model (SSIM). In 2026, he was elected to the National Academy of Sciences.
