= James DiCarlo =

Neuroscientist

James J. DiCarlo
- Born: c. 1967 (age 58–59)
- Education: Northwestern University; Johns Hopkins University
- Known for: Object recognition, ventral stream
- Awards: Alfred P. Sloan Research Fellowship; McKnight Scholar Award in Neuroscience
- Scientific career
- Fields: Neuroscience
- Workplaces: Johns Hopkins University; Baylor College of Medicine; MIT
- Thesis: The spatial and temporal structure of neural receptive fields in area 3b of primary somatosensory cortex in the alert monkey (1998)
- Doctoral advisors: Kenneth O. Johnson; Steven S. Hsiao
- Website: dicarlolab.mit.edu

James Joseph DiCarlo (born c. 1967) is an American neuroscientist currently serving as the Peter de Florez Professor of Neuroscience at the Massachusetts Institute of Technology.

== Biography ==
DiCarlo received his BS in biomedical engineering at Northwestern University in 1990. He then attended the MD PhD program at Johns Hopkins University and graduated in 1998. After spending two years as a postdoctoral researcher in primate visual neurophysiology at Baylor College of Medicine, he joined the faculty at MIT in the Brain and Cognitive Sciences Department.
