= Anthony Zador =

American neuroscientist

- Education: B.A., University of California, Berkeley; MD-PhD, Yale University
- Known for: Molecular approaches to connectomics; neural circuits underlying auditory decision making
- Scientific career
- Fields: Neuroscience
- Institutions: Cold Spring Harbor Laboratory
- Doctoral advisor: Christof Koch
- Other academic advisors: Charles F. Stevens

Anthony M. Zador is an American neuroscientist and the Alle Davis Harris Professor of Biology and Chair of Neuroscience at Cold Spring Harbor Laboratory. He is a co-founder, in 2004, of the Computational and Systems Neuroscience (COSYNE) conference, and of the NAISYS (Neuroscience to Artificially Intelligent Systems) meeting about the intersection of neuroscience and artificial intelligence. Dr. Zador's research has focused on understanding the circuits of the auditory cortex in rodents. More recently, he has pioneered a new approach to connectome mapping using the methods of molecular biology, which may dramatically decrease the cost and improve the speed of mapping neuronal circuits at the single cell level.

== Biography ==
Anthony Zador received a B.A. at the UC, Berkeley and MD/PhD from Yale University, under the supervision of Tom Brown and Christof Koch at Caltech, focusing on machine learning and computational neuroscience. He carried out postdoctoral research in experimental neuroscience at the Salk Institute with Chuck Stevens before assuming a faculty position at Cold Spring Harbor Laboratory, where he served as Chair of Neuroscience from 2008 to 2018.

At CSHL, together with Zachary Mainen, he pioneered the use of quantitative behavioral paradigms in rodents to study perception and cognition. In 2012, Dr. Zador proposed a method harnessing advances in DNA sequencing to map neural circuits with much higher throughput than conventional microscopy-based approaches. This method promises to reconstruct the connectivity matrices of entire brains with single cell resolution. So far, a variant of this approach has been applied to map the projection patterns single locus coeruleus neurons at the mesoscale, and also to the visual cortex. He is also a proponent of neuroAI, the application of neuroscience to AI research.

Zador was recognized as a 2015 Foreign Policy Global Thinker. He is also the winner of the Gill Transformative Investigator Award (2018). He is also an occasional columnist for the Observer, writing on the intersection of science, technology and policy.
