= Rachel Wilson (neurobiologist) =

American neurobiologist

Rachel I. Wilson
- Born: Kansas City, Missouri, U.S.
- Education: Harvard University; University of California, San Francisco
- Awards: MacArthur Fellow
- Scientific career
- Fields: Neurobiology
- Workplaces: Harvard Medical School
- Doctoral advisor: Roger Nicoll

Rachel Wilson is an American professor of neurobiology at Harvard Medical School and is a Howard Hughes Medical Institute Investigator. Wilson's work integrates electrophysiology, calcium imaging, molecular genetics, connectomics, computational modeling, and behavior to explore how neural circuits are organized to sense complex environments, learn associations between environmental features, and organize adaptive behavioral responses.

== Education and early career ==
Wilson was born in Kansas City, Missouri. She received an A.B. in chemistry from Harvard University in 1996 and a Ph.D. in neuroscience from the University of California, San Francisco in 2001, where she worked in the laboratory of Roger Nicoll. There, she searched for the molecule in the brain that enabled neurons to communicate in reverse—known as retrograde signaling—across synapses. She discovered that endocannabinoids—which mimic the active ingredient in marijuana and naturally exist in the brain—were responsible for allowing post-synaptic neurons to communicate to their pre-synaptic counterparts.

Following her Ph.D., Wilson became a postdoctoral researcher at California Institute of Technology, working in the laboratory of Gilles Laurent. There, she began working on Drosophila (fruit flies) as a model organism, seeking to understand how neurons integrate information from their surroundings. She recorded electrical signals in the brain of these flies to understand how those signals corresponded to specific odors as stimuli.

== Research ==
Wilson's laboratory at Harvard University has focused on the neural mechanisms of olfactory and mechanosensory processing, sensory-motor integration, and navigation.

== Awards ==
In 2007 Wilson won Science and Eppendorf AG's Grand Prize in Neurobiology for her work on the olfactory function of fruit flies Drosophila melanogaster, to understand how the brain recognizes odors from patterns of impulses from olfactory receptor neurons.

In 2008 she won a MacArthur Fellowship.

In 2012 she was made a full professor at Harvard Medical School in the Department of Neurobiology; she currently holds the Joseph B. Martin Professorship in Basic Research.

In 2014, she won the inaugural national Blavatnik National Award for Young Scientists, awarded by the Blavatnik Family Foundation and the New York Academy of Sciences to "celebrate America’s most innovative and promising faculty-rank scientists and engineers."

In 2017, Wilson was appointed to the National Academy of Sciences for her contributions to neurophysiology.
