= Zachary Mainen =

American neuroscientist

Zachary F. Mainen (born 20 February 1969) is an American neuroscientist whose research focuses on the brain mechanisms of decision-making.

Zachary Mainen moved to Lisbon, Portugal in 2007 and has been the Director of the Champalimaud Neuroscience Programme (CNP) at the Champalimaud Centre for the Unknown in Lisbon, Portugal, since 2009. He is also leader of the Systems Neuroscience Lab and is the founding director of the International Doctoral Neuroscience Programme (INDP).

== Biography ==
Zachary Mainen was born and raised in Bethesda, Maryland, United States of America. He studied psychology and philosophy at Yale University, received his doctorate in Neuroscience from the University of California, San Diego, and held a faculty position at Cold Spring Harbor Laboratory, New York, before moving to Lisbon to found the Champalimaud Neuroscience Programme.

His work has been recognized by the Advanced Investigator Grant of the European Research Council and the election to the European Molecular Biology Organization.

Mainen’s research explores brain function, especially decision-making, using theory-driven experimental approaches. His laboratory helped to pioneer the use of quantitative behavioral paradigms in rodents and combines those approaches with electrophysiological, optical and genetic techniques to study neural representation and computation. He has a long-standing interest in the issue of how noise and uncertainty impact neural systems and behavior and our understanding of these processes. His lab is currently exploring these questions in the context of odor-guided perceptual decisions and learning, the timing and selection of simple actions, and the role of the neuromodulator serotonin in behavior and cortical function. This work touches on philosophical issues surrounding causality, free will, knowledge and belief.

He is a member of the Editorial Board for Current Biology.
