= Bioelectronics =

Field of research in the convergence of biology and electronics

A ribosome is a biological machine that utilizes protein domain dynamics, which can only be seen by neutron spin echo spectroscopy

Bioelectronics is a field of research in the convergence of biology and electronics.

== Definitions ==
At the first C.E.C. Workshop, in Brussels in November 1991, bioelectronics was defined as 'the use of biological materials and biological architectures for information processing systems and new devices'. Bioelectronics, specifically bio-molecular electronics, were described as 'the research and development of bio-inspired (i.e. self-assembly) inorganic and organic materials and of bio-inspired (i.e. massive parallelism) hardware architectures for the implementation of new information processing systems, sensors and actuators, and for molecular manufacturing down to the atomic scale'. The National Institute of Standards and Technology (NIST), an agency of the United States Department of Commerce, defined bioelectronics in a 2009 report as "the discipline resulting from the convergence of biology and electronics".

Sources for information about the field include the Institute of Electrical and Electronics Engineers (IEEE) with its Elsevier journal Biosensors and Bioelectronics published since 1990. The journal describes the scope of bioelectronics as seeking to : "... exploit biology in conjunction with electronics in a wider context encompassing, for example, biological fuel cells, bionics and biomaterials for information processing, information storage, electronic components and actuators. A key aspect is the interface between biological materials and micro and nano-electronics."

== History ==
The first known study of bioelectronics took place in the 18th century when Italian physician-scientist Luigi Galvani applied a voltage to a pair of detached frog legs. The legs moved, sparking the genesis of bioelectronics. Electronics technology has been applied to biology and medicine since the pacemaker was invented and within the medical imaging industry. In 2009, a survey of publications using the term in title or abstract suggested that the center of activity was in Europe (43 percent), followed by Asia (23 percent) and the United States (20 percent).

== Materials ==
Organic bioelectronics is the application of organic electronic material to the field of bioelectronics. Organic materials (i.e. containing carbon) show great promise when it comes to interfacing with biological systems. Current applications focus around neuroscience and infection.

Conducting polymer coatings, an organic electronic material, shows massive improvement in the technology of materials. It was the most sophisticated form of electrical stimulation. It improved the impedance of electrodes in electrical stimulation, resulting in better recordings and reducing "harmful electrochemical side reactions." Organic Electrochemical Transistors (OECT) were invented in 1984 by Mark Wrighton and colleagues, which had the ability to transport ions. This improved signal-to-noise ratio and gives for low measured impedance. The Organic Electronic Ion Pump (OEIP), a device that could be used to target specific body parts and organs to adhere medicine, was created by Magnuss Berggren.

As one of the few materials established in CMOS technology, titanium nitride (TiN) turned out stable and well suited for electrode applications in medical implants.

== Significant applications ==
Bioelectronics is used to help improve the lives of people with disabilities and diseases. For example, the glucose monitor is a portable device that allows diabetic patients to control and measure their blood sugar levels. Electrical stimulation used to treat patients with epilepsy, chronic pain, Parkinson's, deafness, Essential Tremor and blindness. Magnuss Berggren and colleagues created a variation of his OEIP, the first bioelectronic implant device that was used in a living, free animal for therapeutic reasons. It transmitted electric currents into GABA, an acid. A lack of GABA in the body is a factor in chronic pain. GABA would then be dispersed properly to the damaged nerves, acting as a painkiller. Vagus Nerve Stimulation (VNS) is used to activate the Cholinergic Anti-inflammatory Pathway (CAP) in the vagus nerve, ending in reduced inflammation in patients with diseases like arthritis. Since patients with depression and epilepsy are more vulnerable to having a closed CAP, VNS can aid them as well. At the same time, not all the systems that have electronics used to help improving the lives of people are necessarily bioelectronic devices, but only those which involve an intimate and directly interface of electronics and biological systems.

Bioelectronics could be used to develop new label-free methods for monitoring cancer cell invasion and drug resistance. For example, the electrical resistance of cancer cells could be used to predict the effectiveness of cancer drugs and to identify drugs that are most likely to be effective against a particular type of cancer.

=== Human tissue regeneration ===
Human tissue, like most tissue in multicellular life, is known to be capable of regeneration. While tissue such as skin and even large organs such as the liver have been shown significant capacity for regeneration much of the adult body is thought to possess limited natural regenerative ability. Research in the field of regenerative medicine has identified that developmental bioelectricity can be used to stimulate and modify tissue growth beyond what naturally occurs with efforts to demonstrate its feasibility in mammals underway. Some researchers believe that future advancements could allow for the regeneration of organs or even entire limbs using bioelectronic devices providing the correct signals.

== Future ==
Funding and employment opportunities for developing standards and tools to monitor cells at subcellular resolution have been described as limited. Advances in several scientific fields have enabled the analysis of large cell populations, increasing interest in methods for monitoring individual cells in greater detail. Potential applications include using cells to detect harmful substances and combining biological systems with nanotechnology to develop detection methods.

Bioelectronics research also includes devices for detecting chemical and biological threats, including those associated with bioterrorism. Governments have sought such devices and materials. Miniaturization may enable changes in device performance and capabilities, depending on the design and application.

== See also ==
- Biocomputer
- Bioelectrochemical reactor
- Bioelectrochemistry
- Biosensors
- Biological machine
- Biomedical engineering
- Dielectrophoresis
- DNA digital data storage
- Electrochemical engineering
- Electrophysiology
- Electrotroph
- Galvanism
- GHK current equation
- Hodgkin–Huxley model
- Implant (medicine)
- Membrane potential
- Multielectrode array
- Nernst–Planck equation
- Neurophysics
- Neutron spin echo
- Patch clamp
- Quantitative models of the action potential
- Saltatory conduction
