= Goldman equation =

Generalization of the Nernst equation for the membrane potential

The Goldman–Hodgkin–Katz voltage equation, sometimes called the Goldman equation, is used in cell membrane physiology to determine the resting potential across a cell's membrane, taking into account all of the ions that are permeant through that membrane.

The discoverers of this are David E. Goldman of Columbia University, and the Medicine Nobel laureates Alan Lloyd Hodgkin and Bernard Katz.

== Equation for monovalent ions ==
The GHK voltage equation for $n$ monovalent positive ionic species $M_{i}$ and $m$ negative species $A_{j}$:

$$E_{m} = \frac{RT}{F} \ln{ \left( \frac{ \sum_{i}^{n} P_{M^{+}_{i}}[M^{+}_{i}]_\mathrm{out} + \sum_{j}^{m} P_{A^{-}_{j}}[A^{-}_{j}]_\mathrm{in}}{ \sum_{i}^{n} P_{M^{+}_{i}}[M^{+}_{i}]_\mathrm{in} + \sum_{j}^{m} P_{A^{-}_{j}}[A^{-}_{j}]_\mathrm{out}} \right) }$$

This results in the following if we consider a membrane separating two $\mathrm{K}_{x}\mathrm{Na}_{1-x}\mathrm{Cl}$-solutions:

$$E_{m, \mathrm{K}_{x}\mathrm{\text{Na}}_{1-x}\mathrm{Cl} } = \frac{RT}{F} \ln{ \left( \frac{ P_{\text{Na}}[\text{Na}^{+}]_\mathrm{out} + P_{\text{K}}[\text{K}^{+}]_\mathrm{out} + P_{\text{Cl}}[\text{Cl}^{-}]_\mathrm{in} }{ P_{\text{Na}}[\text{Na}^{+}]_\mathrm{in} + P_{\text{K}}[\text{K}^{+}]_{\mathrm{in}} + P_{\text{Cl}}[\text{Cl}^{-}]_\mathrm{out} } \right) }$$

It is "Nernst-like" but has a term for each permeant ion:

$$E_{m,\text{Na}} = \frac{RT}{F} \ln{ \left( \frac{ P_{\text{Na}}[\text{Na}^{+}]_\mathrm{out}}{ P_{\text{Na}}[\text{Na}^{+}]_\mathrm{in}} \right) }=\frac{RT}{F} \ln{ \left( \frac{ [\text{Na}^{+}]_\mathrm{out}}{ [\text{Na}^{+}]_\mathrm{in}} \right) }$$

- $E_{m}$ = the membrane potential (in volts)
- $P_\mathrm{ion}$ = the membrane permeability for that ion
- $[\mathrm{ion}]_\mathrm{out}$ = the extracellular concentration of that ion
- $[\mathrm{ion}]_\mathrm{in}$ = the intracellular concentration of that ion (in the same units as $[\mathrm{ion}]_\mathrm{out}$)
- $R$ = the ideal gas constant
- $T$ = the temperature in kelvins
- $F$ = Faraday's constant

The units for $P_\mathrm{ion}$ and $[\mathrm{ion}]$ are not important, as they divide out of the equation. Concentrations are commonly expressed in millimoles per liter (also written “millimolar” or “mM”). Permeabilities have units of meters per second.

The scale factor $\frac{RT}{F}$ is approximately 26.7 mV at human body temperature (37 °C). Some authors prefer replacing the natural logarithm, ln, with logarithms with base 10. That involves including a factor $([\log_{10}\exp(1)]^{-1}=\ln(10)=2.30258...)$ in the scale factor, so that it becomes $26.7\,\mathrm{mV}\cdot2.303=61.5\,\mathrm{mV}$, a value often used in neuroscience:

$$E_{X} = 61.5 \, \mathrm{mV}\cdot \log{ \left( \frac{ [X^{+}]_\mathrm{out}}{ [X^{+}]_\mathrm{in}} \right) } = -61.5 \, \mathrm{mV}\cdot \log{ \left( \frac{ [X^{-}]_\mathrm{out}}{ [X^{-}]_\mathrm{in}} \right) }$$

The ionic charge determines the sign of the membrane potential contribution. During an action potential, although the membrane potential changes about 100 mV, the concentrations of ions inside and outside the cell do not change significantly. They are always very close to their respective concentrations when the membrane is at their resting potential.

=== Calculating the scale factor ===
Using $R \approx 8.3 \ \mathrm{J} \cdot \mathrm{K}^{-1} \cdot \mathrm{mol}^{-1}$, $F \approx 9.6 \times 10^4 \ \mathrm{C} \cdot \mathrm{mol}^{-1}$, $T = 310 \ \mathrm{K}$ (assuming body temperature, $37 \ ^\circ \mathrm{C}$), and the fact that one volt equals one joule of energy per coulomb of charge, the equation

$$E_X = \frac{RT}{zF} \ln \frac {X_o}{X_i}$$

can be reduced to

$$\begin{align}
E_X & \approx \frac{0.0267 \ \mathrm{ V}}{z}  \ln \frac {X_o}{X_i} \\
& = \frac{26.7 \ \mathrm{ mV}}{z}  \ln \frac {X_o}{X_i} \\
& \approx \frac{61.5 \ \mathrm{ mV} }{z} \log \frac {X_o}{X_i} &  \end{align}$$

which is the Nernst equation.

== Derivation ==
Goldman's equation seeks to determine the voltage E_{m} across a membrane. A Cartesian coordinate system is used to describe the system, with the z direction being perpendicular to the membrane. Assuming that the system is symmetrical in the x and y directions (around and along the axon, respectively), only the z direction need be considered; thus, the voltage E_{m} is the integral of the z component of the electric field across the membrane.

According to Goldman's model, only two factors influence the motion of ions across a permeable membrane: the average electric field and the difference in ionic concentration from one side of the membrane to the other. The electric field is assumed to be constant across the membrane, so that it can be set equal to E_{m}/L, where L is the thickness of the membrane. For a given ion denoted A with valence n_{A}, its flux j_{A}—in other words, the number of ions crossing per time and per area of the membrane—is given by the formula

$$j_{\mathrm{A}} = -D_{\mathrm{A}}
\left( \frac{d\left[ \mathrm{A}\right]}{dz} - \frac{n_{\mathrm{A}}F}{RT} \frac{E_{m}}{L} \left[ \mathrm{A}\right] \right)$$

The first term corresponds to Fick's law of diffusion, which gives the flux due to diffusion down the concentration gradient, i.e., from high to low concentration. The constant D_{A} is the diffusion constant of the ion A. The second term reflects the flux due to the electric field, which increases linearly with the electric field; Formally, it is [A] multiplied by the drift velocity of the ions, with the drift velocity expressed using the Stokes–Einstein relation applied to electrophoretic mobility. The constants here are the charge valence n_{A} of the ion A (e.g., +1 for K^{+}, +2 for Ca^{2+} and −1 for Cl^{−}), the temperature T (in kelvins), the molar gas constant R, and the faraday F, which is the total charge of a mole of electrons.

This is a first-order ODE of the form y' = ay + b, with y = [A] and y' = d[A]/dz; integrating both sides from z=0 to z=L with the boundary conditions [A](0) = [A]_{in} and [A](L) = [A]_{out}, one gets the solution

$$j_{\mathrm{A}} = \mu n_{\mathrm{A}} P_{\mathrm{A}}
\frac{\left[ \mathrm{A}\right]_{\mathrm{out}} - \left[ \mathrm{A}\right]_{\mathrm{in}} e^{n_{\mathrm{A}}\mu} }{1 - e^{n_{\mathrm{A}}\mu }}$$

where μ is a dimensionless number

$$\mu = \frac{F E_{m}}{RT}$$

and P_{A} is the ionic permeability, defined here as

$$P_{\mathrm{A}} = \frac{D_{\mathrm{A}}}{L}$$

The electric current density J_{A} equals the charge q_{A} of the ion multiplied by the flux j_{A}

$$J_{A} = q_{\mathrm{A}} j_{\mathrm{A}}$$

Current density has units of (Amperes/m^{2}). Molar flux has units of (mol/(s m^{2})). Thus, to get current density from molar flux one needs to multiply by Faraday's constant F (Coulombs/mol). F will then cancel from the equation below. Since the valence has already been accounted for above, the charge q_{A} of each ion in the equation above, therefore, should be interpreted as +1 or −1 depending on the polarity of the ion.

There is such a current associated with every type of ion that can cross the membrane; this is because each type of ion would require a distinct membrane potential to balance diffusion, but there can only be one membrane potential. By assumption, at the Goldman voltage E_{m}, the total current density is zero

$$J_{tot} = \sum_{A} J_{A} = 0$$

(Although the current for each ion type considered here is nonzero, there are other pumps in the membrane, e.g. Na^{+}/K^{+}-ATPase, not considered here which serve to balance each individual ion's current, so that the ion concentrations on either side of the membrane do not change over time in equilibrium.) If all the ions are monovalent—that is, if all the n_{A} equal either +1 or −1—this equation can be written

$$w - v e^{\mu} = 0$$

whose solution is the Goldman equation

$$\frac{F E_{m}}{RT} = \mu = \ln \frac{w}{v}$$

where

$$w = \sum_{\mathrm{cations\ C}} P_{\mathrm{C}} \left[ \mathrm{C}^{+} \right]_{\mathrm{out}} +
\sum_{\mathrm{anions\ A}} P_{\mathrm{A}} \left[ \mathrm{A}^{-} \right]_{\mathrm{in}}$$

$$v = \sum_{\mathrm{cations\ C}} P_{\mathrm{C}} \left[ \mathrm{C}^{+} \right]_{\mathrm{in}} +
\sum_{\mathrm{anions\ A}} P_{\mathrm{A}} \left[ \mathrm{A}^{-} \right]_{\mathrm{out}}$$

If divalent ions such as calcium are considered, terms such as e^{2μ} appear, which is the square of e^{μ}; in this case, the formula for the Goldman equation can be solved using the quadratic formula.

== See also ==
- Bioelectronics
- Cable theory
- GHK current equation
- Hindmarsh–Rose model
- Hodgkin–Huxley model
- Morris–Lecar model
- Nernst equation
- Saltatory conduction
