= Resting potential =

Static membrane potential in biology

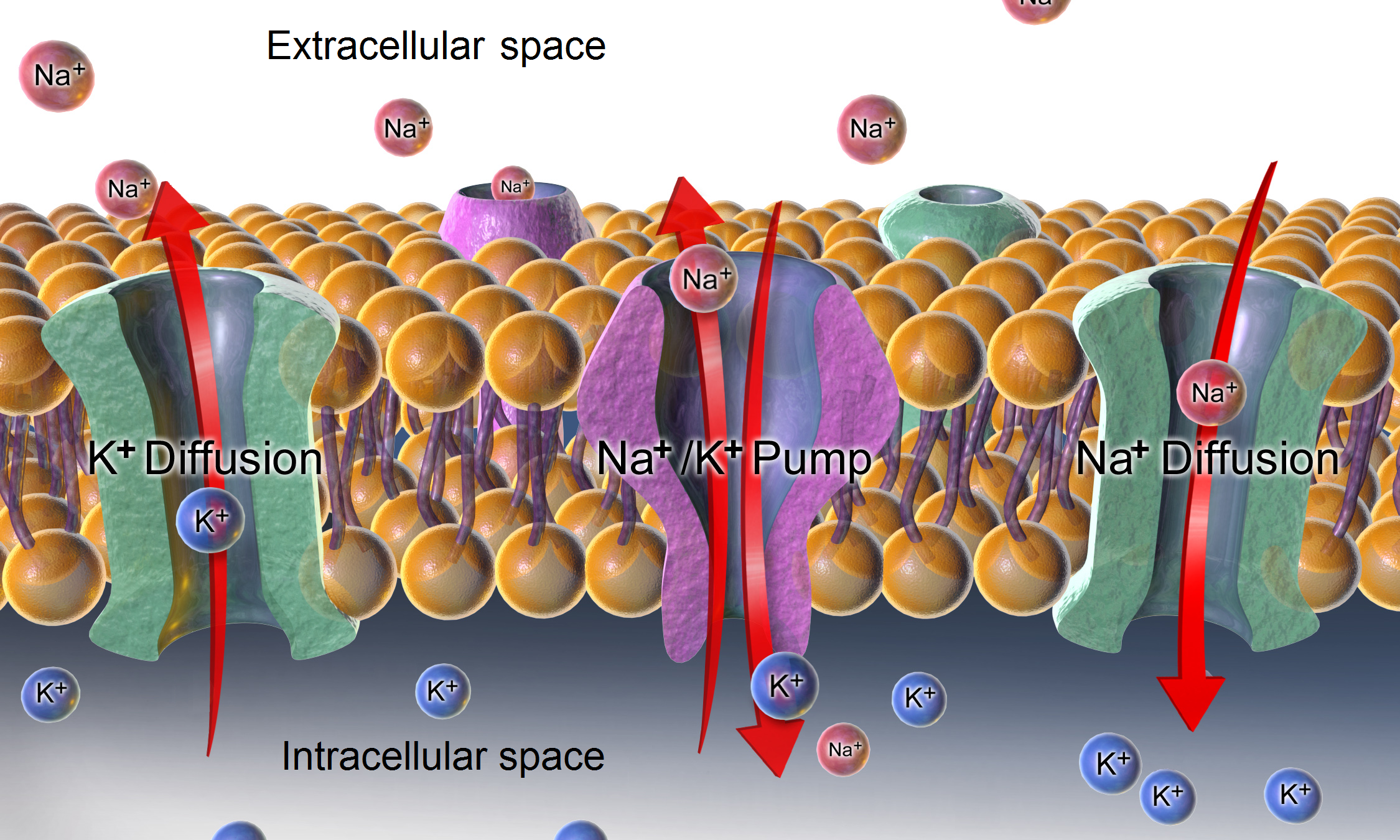
The Na^{+}/K^{+}-ATPase, as well as effects of diffusion of the involved ions, are major mechanisms to maintain the resting potential across the membranes of animal cells.

Resting potential is the electrical potential difference across the plasma membrane of a cell in a non-excited state.

The relatively static membrane potential of quiescent cells is called the resting membrane potential (or resting voltage), as opposed to the specific dynamic electrochemical phenomena called action potential and graded membrane potential. The resting membrane potential has a value of approximately −70 mV or −0.07 V. (Note: Kandel, et al.(2014) p.30 give a resting potential of -65 mV, compared to 0 V outside the cell membrane.)

Apart from the latter two, which occur in excitable cells (neurons, muscles, and some secretory cells in glands), membrane voltage in the majority of non-excitable cells can also undergo changes in response to environmental or intracellular stimuli. The resting potential exists due to the differences in membrane permeabilities for potassium, sodium, calcium, and chloride ions, which in turn result from functional activity of various ion channels, ion transporters, and exchangers. Conventionally, resting membrane potential can be defined as a relatively stable, ground value of transmembrane voltage in animal and plant cells.

Because the membrane permeability for potassium is much higher than that for other ions, and because of the strong chemical gradient for potassium, potassium ions flow from the cytosol out to the extracellular space carrying out positive charge, until their movement is balanced by build-up of negative charge on the inner surface of the membrane. Again, because of the high relative permeability for potassium, the resulting membrane potential is almost always close to the potassium reversal potential. But in order for this process to occur, a concentration gradient of potassium ions must first be set up. This work is done by the ion pumps/transporters and/or exchangers and generally is powered by ATP.

In the case of the resting membrane potential across an animal cell's plasma membrane, potassium (and sodium) gradients are established by the Na^{+}/K^{+}-ATPase (sodium-potassium pump) which transports 2 potassium ions inside and 3 sodium ions outside at the cost of 1 ATP molecule. In other cases, for example, a membrane potential may be established by acidification of the inside of a membranous compartment (such as the proton pump that generates membrane potential across synaptic vesicle membranes).

== Electroneutrality ==
In most quantitative treatments of membrane potential, such as the derivation of Goldman equation, electroneutrality is assumed; that is, that there is no measurable charge excess on either side of the membrane. So, although there is an electric potential across the membrane due to charge separation, there is no actual measurable difference in the global concentration of positive and negative ions across the membrane (as it is estimated below), that is, there is no actual measurable charge excess on either side. That occurs because the effect of charge on electrochemical potential is hugely greater than the effect of concentration so an undetectable change in concentration creates a great change in electric potential.

== Generation of the resting potential ==
Cell membranes are typically permeable to only a subset of ions. These usually include potassium ions, chloride ions, bicarbonate ions, and others. To simplify the description of the ionic basis of the resting membrane potential, it is most useful to consider only one ionic species at first, and consider the others later. Since trans-plasma-membrane potentials are almost always determined primarily by potassium permeability, that is where to start.

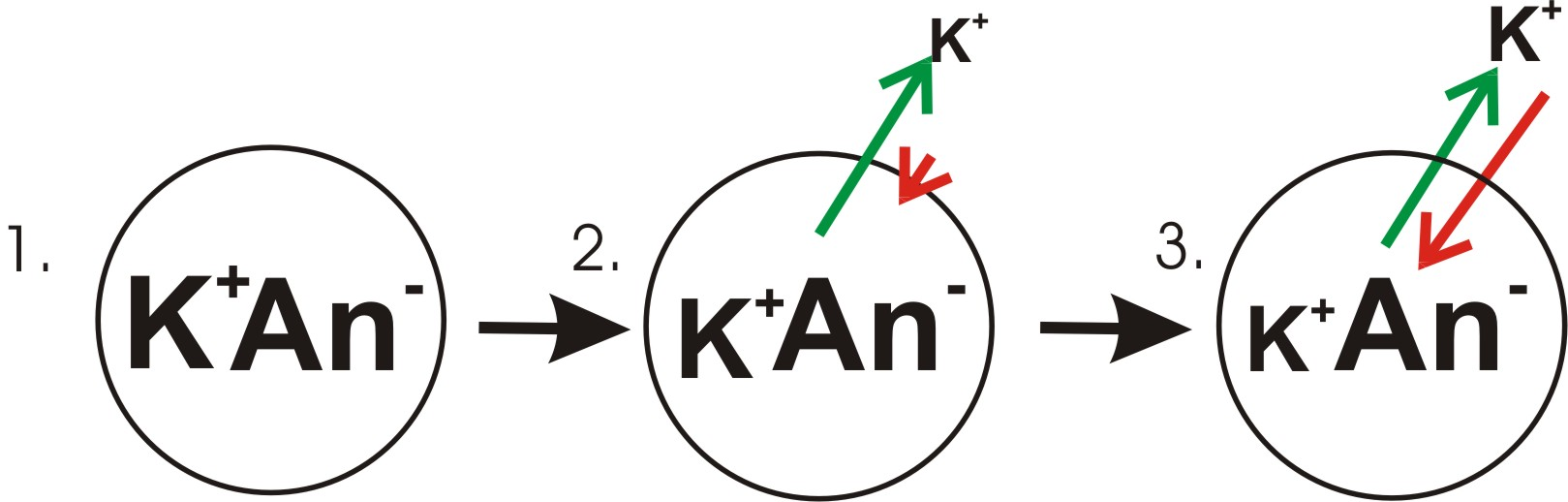
A diagram showing the progression in the development of a membrane potential from a concentration gradient (for potassium). Green arrows indicate net movement of K^{+} down a concentration gradient. Red arrows indicate net movement of K^{+} due to the membrane potential. The diagram is misleading in that while the concentration of potassium ions outside of the cell increases, only a small amount of K^{+} needs to cross the membrane in order to produce a membrane potential with a magnitude large enough to counter the tendency of the potassium ions to move down the concentration gradient.

- Panel 1 of the diagram shows a diagrammatic representation of a simple cell where a concentration gradient has already been established. This panel is drawn as if the membrane has no permeability to any ion. There is no membrane potential because despite there being a concentration gradient for potassium, there is no net charge imbalance across the membrane. If the membrane were to become permeable to a type of ion that is more concentrated on one side of the membrane, then that ion would contribute to membrane voltage because the permeant ions would move across the membrane with net movement of that ion type down the concentration gradient. There would be net movement from the side of the membrane with a higher concentration of the ion to the side with lower concentration. Such a movement of one ion across the membrane would result in a net imbalance of charge across the membrane and a membrane potential. This is a common mechanism by which many cells establish a membrane potential.
- In panel 2 of the diagram, the cell membrane has been made permeable to potassium ions, but not the anions (An^{−}) inside the cell. These anions are mostly contributed by protein. There is energy stored in the potassium ion concentration gradient that can be converted into an electrical gradient when potassium (K^{+}) ions move out of the cell. Because there is a higher concentration of potassium ions inside the cells, their random molecular motion is more likely to encounter the permeability pore (ion channel) than is the case for the potassium ions that are outside and at a lower concentration. The net movement of potassium ions is therefore down the concentration gradient, moving out of the cell and leaving the anions behind. A charge separation now develops as K^{+} leaves the cell. This charge separation creates a transmembrane voltage. This transmembrane voltage is the membrane potential. As potassium continues to leave the cell, separating more charges, the membrane potential will continue to grow. The length of the arrows (green indicating concentration gradient, red indicating voltage), represents the magnitude of potassium ion movement due to each form of energy. The direction of the arrow indicates the direction in which that particular force is applied. Thus, the building membrane voltage is an increasing force that acts counter to the tendency for net movement of potassium ions down the potassium concentration gradient.
- In Panel 3, the membrane voltage has grown to the extent that its "strength" now matches the concentration gradients. Since these forces (which are applied to K^{+}) are now the same strength and oriented in opposite directions, the system is now in equilibrium. Put another way, the tendency of potassium to leave the cell by running down its concentration gradient is now matched by the tendency of the membrane voltage to pull potassium ions back into the cell. K^{+} continues to move across the membrane, but the rate at which it enters and leaves the cell are the same, thus, there is no net potassium current. Because the K^{+} is at equilibrium, membrane potential is stable, or "resting" (E_{K}).

The resting voltage is the result of several ion-translocating enzymes (uniporters, cotransporters, and pumps) in the plasma membrane, steadily operating in parallel, whereby each ion-translocator has its characteristic electromotive force (= reversal potential = 'equilibrium voltage'), depending on the particular substrate concentrations inside and outside (internal ATP included in case of some pumps). H^{+} exporting ATPase render the membrane voltage in plants and fungi much more negative than in the more extensively investigated animal cells, where the resting voltage is mainly determined by selective ion channels.

In most neurons the resting potential has a value of approximately −70 mV. The resting potential is mostly determined by the concentrations of the ions in the fluids on both sides of the cell membrane and the ion transport proteins that are in the cell membrane. How the concentrations of ions and the membrane transport proteins influence the value of the resting potential is outlined below.

The resting potential of a cell can be most thoroughly understood by thinking of it in terms of equilibrium potentials. In the example diagram here, the model cell was given only one permeant ion (potassium). In this case, the resting potential of this cell would be the same as the equilibrium potential for potassium.

However, a real cell is more complicated, having permeabilities to many ions, each of which contributes to the resting potential. To understand better, consider a cell with only two permeant ions, potassium, and sodium. Consider a case where these two ions have equal concentration gradients directed in opposite directions, and that the membrane permeabilities to both ions are equal. K^{+} leaving the cell will tend to drag the membrane potential toward E_{K}. Na^{+} entering the cell will tend to drag the membrane potential toward the reversal potential for sodium E_{Na}. Since the permeabilities to both ions were set to be equal, the membrane potential will, at the end of the Na^{+}/K^{+} tug-of-war, end up halfway between E_{Na} and E_{K}. As E_{Na} and E_{K} were equal but of opposite signs, halfway in between is zero, meaning that the membrane will rest at 0 mV.

Note that even though the membrane potential at 0 mV is stable, it is not an equilibrium condition because neither of the contributing ions is in equilibrium. Ions diffuse down their electrochemical gradients through ion channels, but the membrane potential is upheld by continual K^{+} influx and Na^{+} efflux via ion transporters. Such situation with similar permeabilities for counter-acting ions, like potassium and sodium in animal cells, can be extremely costly for the cell if these permeabilities are relatively large, as it takes a lot of ATP energy to pump the ions back. Because no real cell can afford such equal and large ionic permeabilities at rest, resting potential of animal cells is determined by predominant high permeability to potassium and adjusted to the required value by modulating sodium and chloride permeabilities and gradients.

In a healthy animal cell Na^{+} permeability is about 5% of the K^{+} permeability or even less, whereas the respective reversal potentials are +60 mV for sodium (E_{Na})and −80 mV for potassium (E_{K}). Thus the membrane potential will not be right at E_{K}, but rather depolarized from E_{K} by an amount of approximately 5% of the 140 mV difference between E_{K} and E_{Na}. Thus, the cell's resting potential will be about −73 mV.

In a more formal notation, the membrane potential is the weighted average of each contributing ion's equilibrium potential. The size of each weight is the relative conductance of each ion. In the normal case, where three ions contribute to the membrane potential:

$$E_{m} = \frac{g_{K^+}} {g_{tot}} E_{K^+} + \frac{g_{Na^+}} {g_{tot}} E_{Na^+} + \frac{g_{Cl^-}} {g_{tot}} E_{Cl^-}$$,

where

- E_{m} is the membrane potential, measured in volts
- E_{X} is the equilibrium potential for ion X, also in volts
- g_{X}/g_{tot} is the relative conductance of ion X, which is dimensionless
- g_{tot} is the total conductance of all permeant ions in arbitrary units (e.g. siemens for electrical conductance), in this case g_{K^{+}} + g_{Na^{+}} + g_{Cl^{−}}

== Membrane transport proteins ==
For determination of membrane potentials, the two most important types of membrane ion transport proteins are ion channels and ion transporters. Ion channel proteins create paths across cell membranes through which ions can passively diffuse without direct expenditure of metabolic energy. They have selectivity for certain ions, thus, there are potassium-, chloride-, and sodium-selective ion channels. Different cells and even different parts of one cell (dendrites, cell bodies, nodes of Ranvier) will have different amounts of various ion transport proteins. Typically, the amount of certain potassium channels is most important for control of the resting potential (see below). Some ion pumps such as the Na+/K+-ATPase are electrogenic, that is, they produce charge imbalance across the cell membrane and can also contribute directly to the membrane potential. Most pumps use metabolic energy (ATP) to function.

== Equilibrium potentials ==
For most animal cells potassium ions (K^{+}) are the most important for the resting potential. Due to the active transport of potassium ions, the concentration of potassium is higher inside cells than outside. Most cells have potassium-selective ion channel proteins that remain open all the time. There will be net movement of positively charged potassium ions through these potassium channels with a resulting accumulation of excess negative charge inside of the cell. The outward movement of positively charged potassium ions is due to random molecular motion (diffusion) and continues until enough excess negative charge accumulates inside the cell to form a membrane potential which can balance the difference in concentration of potassium between inside and outside the cell. "Balance" means that the electrical force (potential) that results from the build-up of ionic charge, and which impedes outward diffusion, increases until it is equal in magnitude but opposite in direction to the tendency for outward diffusive movement of potassium. This balance point is an equilibrium potential as the net transmembrane flux (or current) of K^{+} is zero. A good approximation for the equilibrium potential of a given ion only needs the concentrations on either side of the membrane and the temperature. It can be calculated using the Nernst equation:

$$E_{eq,K^+} = \frac{RT}{zF} \ln \frac{[K^+]_{o}}{[K^+]_{i}} ,$$

where

- E_{eq,K^{+}} is the equilibrium potential for potassium, measured in volts
- R is the universal gas constant, equal to 8.314 joules·K^{−1}·mol^{−1}
- T is the absolute temperature, measured in kelvins (= K = degrees Celsius + 273.15)
- z is the number of elementary charges of the ion in question involved in the reaction
- F is the Faraday constant, equal to 96,485 coulombs·mol^{−1} or J·V^{−1}·mol^{−1}
- [K^{+}]_{o} is the extracellular concentration of potassium, measured in mol·m^{−3} or mmol·l^{−1}
- [K^{+}]_{i} is likewise the intracellular concentration of potassium

Potassium equilibrium potentials of around −80 millivolts (inside negative) are common. Differences are observed in different species, different tissues within the same animal, and the same tissues under different environmental conditions. Applying the Nernst Equation above, one may account for these differences by changes in relative K^{+} concentration or differences in temperature.

For common usage the Nernst equation is often given in a simplified form by assuming typical human body temperature (37 °C), reducing the constants and switching to Log base 10. (The units used for concentration are unimportant as they will cancel out into a ratio). For Potassium at normal body temperature one may calculate the equilibrium potential in millivolts as:

$$E_{eq,K^+} = 61.54 mV \log \frac{[K^+]_{o}}{[K^+]_{i}} ,$$

Likewise the equilibrium potential for sodium (Na^{+}) at normal human body temperature is calculated using the same simplified constant. You can calculate E assuming an outside concentration, [K^{+}]_{o}, of 10mM and an inside concentration, [K^{+}]_{i}, of 100mM. For chloride ions (Cl^{−}) the sign of the constant must be reversed (−61.54 mV). If calculating the equilibrium potential for calcium (Ca^{2+}) the 2+ charge halves the simplified constant to 30.77 mV. If working at room temperature, about 21 °C, the calculated constants are approximately 58 mV for K^{+} and Na^{+}, −58 mV for Cl^{−} and 29 mV for Ca^{2+}. At physiological temperature, about 29.5 °C, and physiological concentrations (which vary for each ion), the calculated potentials are approximately 67 mV for Na^{+}, −90 mV for K^{+}, −86 mV for Cl^{−} and 123 mV for Ca^{2+}.

== Resting potentials ==
The resting membrane potential is not an equilibrium potential as it relies on the constant expenditure of energy (for ionic pumps as mentioned above) for its maintenance. It is a dynamic diffusion potential that takes this mechanism into account—wholly unlike the pillows equilibrium potential, which is true no matter the nature of the system under consideration. The resting membrane potential is dominated by the ionic species in the system that has the greatest conductance across the membrane. For most cells this is potassium. As potassium is also the ion with the most negative equilibrium potential, usually the resting potential can be no more negative than the potassium equilibrium potential. The resting potential can be calculated with the Goldman-Hodgkin-Katz voltage equation using the concentrations of ions as for the equilibrium potential while also including the relative permeabilities of each ionic species. Under normal conditions, it is safe to assume that only potassium (K^{+}), sodium (Na^{+}) and chloride (Cl^{−}) ions play large roles for the resting potential:

$$E_{m} = \frac{RT}{F} \ln{ \left( \frac{ P_{Na^+}[Na^+]_{o} + P_{K^+}[K^+]_{o} + P_{Cl^-}[Cl^-]_{i} }{ P_{Na^+}[Na^+]_{i} + P_{K^+}[K^+]_{i} + P_{Cl^-}[Cl^-]_{o} } \right) }$$

This equation resembles the Nernst equation, but has a term for each permeant ion. Also, z has been inserted into the equation, causing the intracellular and extracellular concentrations of Cl^{−} to be reversed relative to K^{+} and Na^{+}, as chloride's negative charge is handled by inverting the fraction inside the logarithmic term. Here:

- E_{m} is the membrane potential, measured in volts;
- R, T, and F are as above;
- P_{s} is the relative permeability of ion s;
- [s]_{Y} is the concentration of ion s in compartment Y as above.

Another way to view the membrane potential, considering instead the conductance of the ion channels rather than the permeability of the membrane, is using the Millman equation (also called the Chord Conductance Equation):

$$E_{m} = \frac{g_{K^+}E_{eq,K^+} + g_{Na^+}E_{eq,Na^+} + g_{Cl^-}E_{eq,Cl^-}} {g_{K^+}+g_{Na^+}+g_{Cl^-}}$$

or reformulated

$$E_{m} = \frac{g_{K^+}} {g_{tot}} E_{eq,K^+} + \frac{g_{Na^+}} {g_{tot}} E_{eq,Na^+} + \frac{g_{Cl^-}} {g_{tot}} E_{eq,Cl^-}$$

where g_{tot} is the combined conductance of all ionic species, again in arbitrary units. The latter equation portrays the resting membrane potential as a weighted average of the reversal potentials of the system, where the weights are the relative conductances of each ion species (g_{X}/g_{tot}). During the action potential, these weights change. If the conductances of Na^{+} and Cl^{−} are zero, the membrane potential reduces to the Nernst potential for K^{+} (as g_{K^{+}} = g_{tot}). Normally, under resting conditions g_{Na+} and g_{Cl−} are not zero, but they are much smaller than g_{K+}, which renders E_{m} close to E_{eq,K+}. Medical conditions such as hyperkalemia in which blood serum potassium (which governs [K^{+}]_{o}) is changed are very dangerous since they offset E_{eq,K+}, thus affecting E_{m}. This may cause arrhythmias and cardiac arrest. The use of a bolus injection of potassium chloride in executions by lethal injection stops the heart by shifting the resting potential to a more positive value, which depolarizes and contracts the cardiac cells permanently, not allowing the heart to repolarize and thus enter diastole to be refilled with blood.

Although the GHK voltage equation and Millman's equation are related, they are not equivalent. The critical difference is that Millman's equation assumes the current-voltage relationship to be ohmic, whereas the GHK voltage equation takes into consideration the small, instantaneous rectifications predicted by the GHK flux equation caused by the concentration gradient of ions. Thus, a more accurate estimate of membrane potential can be calculated using the GHK equation than with Millman's equation.

== Measuring resting potentials ==
In some cells, the membrane potential is always changing (such as cardiac pacemaker cells). For such cells there is never any "rest" and the "resting potential" is a theoretical concept. Other cells with little in the way of membrane transport functions that change with time have a resting membrane potential that can be measured by inserting an electrode into the cell. Transmembrane potentials can also be measured optically with dyes that change their optical properties according to the membrane potential.

== Summary of resting potential values in different types of cells ==
Cell types	Resting potential
Skeletal muscle cells	−95 mV
Astroglia	−80 to −90 mV
Neurons	−60 to −70 mV
Smooth muscle cells	−60 mV
Aorta Smooth muscle tissue	−45 mV
Photoreceptor cells	−40 mV
Hair cell (Cochlea)	−15 to −40 mV
Erythrocytes	−8.4 mV
Chondrocytes	−8 mV

== History ==
Resting currents in nerves were measured and described by Julius Bernstein in 1902 where he proposed a "Membrane Theory" that explained the resting potential of nerve and muscle as a diffusion potential.

== See also ==
- Action potential
- Depolarization
- Hyperpolarization (biology)
- Membrane potential
