= Models of neural computation =

Models of neural computation are attempts to elucidate, in an abstract and mathematical fashion, the core principles that underlie information processing in biological nervous systems, or functional components thereof. This article aims to provide an overview of the most definitive models of neuro-biological computation as well as the tools commonly used to construct and analyze them.

== Introduction ==
Due to the complexity of nervous system behavior, the associated experimental error bounds are ill-defined, but the relative merit of the different models of a particular subsystem can be compared according to how closely they reproduce real-world behaviors or respond to specific input signals. In the closely related field of computational neuroethology, the practice is to include the environment in the model in such a way that the loop is closed. In the cases where competing models are unavailable, or where only gross responses have been measured or quantified, a clearly formulated model can guide the scientist in designing experiments to probe biochemical mechanisms or network connectivity.

In all but the simplest cases, the mathematical equations that form the basis of a model cannot be solved exactly. Nevertheless, computer technology, sometimes in the form of specialized software or hardware architectures, allow scientists to perform iterative calculations and search for plausible solutions. A computer chip or a robot that can interact with the natural environment in ways akin to the original organism is one embodiment of a useful model. The ultimate measure of success is however the ability to make testable predictions.

== General criteria for evaluating models ==
=== Speed of information processing ===
The rate of information processing in biological neural systems are constrained by the speed at which an action potential can propagate down a nerve fibre. This conduction velocity ranges from 1 m/s to over 100 m/s, and generally increases with the diameter of the neuronal process. Slow in the timescales of biologically-relevant events dictated by the speed of sound or the force of gravity, the nervous system overwhelmingly prefers parallel computations over serial ones in time-critical applications.

=== Robustness ===
A model is robust if it continues to produce the same computational results under variations in inputs or operating parameters introduced by noise. For example, the direction of motion as computed by a robust motion detector would not change under small changes of luminance, contrast or velocity jitter. For simple mathematical models of neuron, for example the dependence of spike patterns on signal delay is much weaker than the dependence on changes in "weights" of interneuronal connections.

=== Gain control ===
This refers to the principle that the response of a nervous system should stay within certain bounds even as the inputs from the environment change drastically. For example, when adjusting between a sunny day and a moonless night, the retina changes the relationship between light level and neuronal output by a factor of more than $10^6$ so that the signals sent to later stages of the visual system always remain within a much narrower range of amplitudes.

=== Linearity versus nonlinearity ===
A linear system is one whose response in a specified unit of measure, to a set of inputs considered at once, is the sum of its responses due to the inputs considered individually.

Linear systems are easier to analyze mathematically and are a persuasive assumption in many models including the McCulloch and Pitts neuron, population coding models, and the simple neurons often used in Artificial neural networks. Linearity may occur in the basic elements of a neural circuit such as the response of a postsynaptic neuron, or as an emergent property of a combination of nonlinear subcircuits. Though linearity is often seen as incorrect, there has been recent work suggesting it may, in fact, be biophysically plausible in some cases.

== Examples ==
A computational neural model may be constrained to the level of biochemical signalling in individual neurons or it may describe an entire organism in its environment. The examples here are grouped according to their scope.

=== Models of information transfer in neurons ===
The most widely used models of information transfer in biological neurons are based on analogies with electrical circuits. The equations to be solved are time-dependent differential equations with electro-dynamical variables such as current, conductance or resistance, capacitance and voltage.

==== Hodgkin–Huxley model and its derivatives ====
The Hodgkin–Huxley model, widely regarded as one of the great achievements of 20th-century biophysics, describes how action potentials in neurons are initiated and propagated in axons via voltage-gated ion channels. It is a set of nonlinear ordinary differential equations that were introduced by Alan Lloyd Hodgkin and Andrew Huxley in 1952 to explain the results of voltage clamp experiments on the squid giant axon. Analytic solutions do not exist, but the Levenberg–Marquardt algorithm, a modified Gauss–Newton algorithm, is often used to fit these equations to voltage-clamp data.

The FitzHugh–Nagumo model is a simplification of the Hodgkin–Huxley model. The Hindmarsh–Rose model is an extension which describes neuronal spike bursts. The Morris–Lecar model is a modification which does not generate spikes, but describes slow-wave propagation, which is implicated in the inhibitory synaptic mechanisms of central pattern generators.

==== Solitons ====
The soliton model is an alternative to the Hodgkin–Huxley model that claims to explain how action potentials are initiated and conducted in the form of certain kinds of solitary sound (or density) pulses that can be modeled as solitons along axons, based on a thermodynamic theory of nerve pulse propagation.

==== Transfer functions and linear filters ====
This approach, influenced by control theory and signal processing, treats neurons and synapses as time-invariant entities that produce outputs that are linear combinations of input signals, often depicted as sine waves with a well-defined temporal or spatial frequencies.

The entire behavior of a neuron or synapse are encoded in a transfer function, lack of knowledge concerning the exact underlying mechanism notwithstanding. This brings a highly developed mathematics to bear on the problem of information transfer.

The accompanying taxonomy of linear filters turns out to be useful in characterizing neural circuitry. Both low- and high-pass filters are postulated to exist in some form in sensory systems, as they act to prevent information loss in high and low contrast environments, respectively.

Indeed, measurements of the transfer functions of neurons in the horseshoe crab retina according to linear systems analysis show that they remove short-term fluctuations in input signals leaving only the long-term trends, in the manner of low-pass filters. These animals are unable to see low-contrast objects without the help of optical distortions caused by underwater currents.

=== Models of computations in sensory systems ===
==== Lateral inhibition in the retina: Hartline–Ratliff equations ====
In the retina, an excited neural receptor can suppress the activity of surrounding neurons within an area called the inhibitory field. This effect, known as lateral inhibition, increases the contrast and sharpness in visual response, but leads to the epiphenomenon of Mach bands. This is often illustrated by the optical illusion of light or dark stripes next to a sharp boundary between two regions in an image of different luminance.

The Hartline-Ratliff model describes interactions within a group of p photoreceptor cells. Assuming these interactions to be linear, they proposed the following relationship for the steady-state response rate $r_p$ of the given p-th photoreceptor in terms of the steady-state response rates $r_j$ of the j surrounding receptors:

$r_{p}=\left|\left[e_{p}-\sum_{j=1,j\ne p}^{n}k_{pj}\left|r_{j}-r_{pj}^{o}\right|\right]\right|$.

Here,

$e_p$ is the excitation of the target p-th receptor from sensory transduction

$r_{pj}^o$ is the associated threshold of the firing cell, and

$k_{pj}$ is the coefficient of inhibitory interaction between the p-th and the jth receptor. The inhibitory interaction decreases with distance from the target p-th receptor.

==== Cross-correlation in sound localization: Jeffress model ====
According to Jeffress, in order to compute the location of a sound source in space from interaural time differences, an auditory system relies on delay lines: the induced signal from an ipsilateral auditory receptor to a particular neuron is delayed for the same time as it takes for the original sound to go in space from that ear to the other. Each postsynaptic cell is differently delayed and thus specific for a particular inter-aural time difference. This theory is equivalent to the mathematical procedure of cross-correlation.

Following Fischer and Anderson, the response of the postsynaptic neuron to the signals from the left and right ears is given by

$y_{R}\left(t\right) - y_{L}\left(t\right)$

where

$y_{L}\left(t\right)=\int_{0}^{\tau}u_{L}\left(\sigma\right)w\left(t-\sigma\right)d\sigma$

$y_{R}\left(t\right)=\int_{0}^{\tau}u_{R}\left(\sigma\right)w\left(t-\sigma\right)d\sigma$

and

$w\left(t-\sigma\right)$ represents the delay function. This is not entirely correct and a clear eye is needed to put the symbols in order.

Structures have been located in the barn owl which are consistent with Jeffress-type mechanisms.

==== Cross-correlation for motion detection: Hassenstein–Reichardt model ====
A motion detector needs to satisfy three general requirements: pair-inputs, asymmetry and nonlinearity. The cross-correlation operation implemented asymmetrically on the responses from a pair of photoreceptors satisfies these minimal criteria, and furthermore, predicts features which have been observed in the response of neurons of the lobula plate in bi-wing insects.

The master equation for response is

$R = A_1(t-\tau)B_2(t) - A_2(t - \tau)B_1(t)$

The HR model predicts a peaking of the response at a particular input temporal frequency. The conceptually similar Barlow–Levick model is deficient in the sense that a stimulus presented to only one receptor of the pair is sufficient to generate a response. This is unlike the HR model, which requires two correlated signals delivered in a time ordered fashion. However the HR model does not show a saturation of response at high contrasts, which is observed in experiment. Extensions of the Barlow-Levick model can provide for this discrepancy.

==== Watson–Ahumada model for motion estimation in humans ====
This uses a cross-correlation in both the spatial and temporal directions, and is related to the concept of optical flow.

=== Anti-Hebbian adaptation: spike-timing dependent plasticity ===
- Tzounopoulos, T; Kim, Y; Oertel, D; Trussell, LO (2004). "Cell-specific, spike timing-dependent plasticities in the dorsal cochlear nucleus". Nat Neurosci. 7 (7): 719–725. doi:10.1038/nn1272. PMID 15208632. S2CID 17774457.
- Roberts, Patrick D.; Portfors, Christine V. (2008). "Design principles of sensory processing in cerebellum-like structures". Biological Cybernetics. 98 (6): 491–507. doi:10.1007/s00422-008-0217-1. PMID 18491162. S2CID 14393814.

=== Models of sensory-motor coupling ===
==== Neurophysiological metronomes: neural circuits for pattern generation ====
Mutually inhibitory processes are a unifying motif of all central pattern generators. This has been demonstrated in the stomatogastric (STG) nervous system of crayfish and lobsters. Two and three-cell oscillating networks based on the STG have been constructed which are amenable to mathematical analysis, and which depend in a simple way on synaptic strengths and overall activity, presumably the knobs on these things. The mathematics involved is the theory of dynamical systems.

==== Feedback and control: models of flight control in the fly ====
Flight control in the fly is believed to be mediated by inputs from the visual system and also the halteres, a pair of knob-like organs which measure angular velocity. Integrated computer models of Drosophila, short on neuronal circuitry but based on the general guidelines given by control theory and data from the tethered flights of flies, have been constructed to investigate the details of flight control.

==== Cerebellum sensory motor control ====
Tensor network theory is a theory of cerebellar function that provides a mathematical model of the transformation of sensory space-time coordinates into motor coordinates and vice versa by cerebellar neuronal networks. The theory was developed by Andras Pellionisz and Rodolfo Llinas in the 1980s as a geometrization of brain function (especially of the central nervous system) using tensors.

== Software modelling approaches and tools ==
=== Neural networks ===
In this approach the strength and type, excitatory or inhibitory, of synaptic connections are represented by the magnitude and sign of weights, that is, numerical coefficients $w'$ in front of the inputs $x$ to a particular neuron. The response of the $j$-th neuron is given by a sum of nonlinear, usually "sigmoidal" functions $g$ of the inputs as:

$f_{j}=\sum_{i}g\left(w_{ji}'x_{i}+b_{j}\right)$.

This response is then fed as input into other neurons and so on. The goal is to optimize the weights of the neurons to output a desired response at the output layer respective to a set given inputs at the input layer. This optimization of the neuron weights is often performed using the backpropagation algorithm and an optimization method such as gradient descent or Newton's method of optimization. Backpropagation compares the output of the network with the expected output from the training data, then updates the weights of each neuron to minimize the contribution of that individual neuron to the total error of the network.

=== Genetic algorithms ===
Genetic algorithms are used to evolve neural (and sometimes body) properties in a model brain-body-environment system so as to exhibit some desired behavioral performance. The evolved agents can then be subjected to a detailed analysis to uncover their principles of operation. Evolutionary approaches are particularly useful for exploring spaces of possible solutions to a given behavioral task because these approaches minimize a priori assumptions about how a given behavior ought to be instantiated. They can also be useful for exploring different ways to complete a computational neuroethology model when only partial neural circuitry is available for a biological system of interest.

=== NEURON ===
The NEURON software, developed at Duke University, is a simulation environment for modeling individual neurons and networks of neurons. The NEURON environment is a self-contained environment allowing interface through its GUI or via scripting with hoc or python. The NEURON simulation engine is based on a Hodgkin–Huxley type model using a Borg–Graham formulation. Several examples of models written in NEURON are available from the online database ModelDB.

== Embodiment in electronic hardware ==
=== Conductance-based silicon neurons ===
Nervous systems differ from the majority of silicon-based computing devices in that they resemble analog computers (not digital data processors) and massively parallel processors, not sequential processors. To model nervous systems accurately, in real-time, alternative hardware is required.

The most realistic circuits to date make use of analog properties of existing digital electronics (operated under non-standard conditions) to realize Hodgkin–Huxley-type models in silico.

=== Retinomorphic chips ===
Circuits containing retinomorphic sensors are used to model complementary visual processing systems driven by retinal ganglion cells.

== See also ==
- Cognitive architecture
- Cognitive map
- Computational neuroscience
- Motion perception
- Neural coding
- Neural correlate
- Neural decoding
- Neuroethology
- Neuroinformatics
- Quantitative models of the action potential
- Spiking neural network
- Systems neuroscience
