= Morris–Lecar model =

Biological neuron model

The Morris–Lecar model is a biological neuron model developed by professors Catherine Morris and Harold Lecar to reproduce the variety of oscillatory behavior in relation to Ca^{++} and K^{+} conductance in the muscle fiber of the giant barnacle . Morris–Lecar neurons exhibit both class I and class II neuron excitability.

== History ==
Catherine Morris (b. 1949) is a Canadian biologist. She won a Commonwealth scholarship to study at Cambridge University, where she earned her PhD in 1977. She became a professor at the University of Ottawa in the early 1980s. As of 2015, she is an emeritus professor at the University of Ottawa. Harold Lecar (18 October 1935 – 4 February 2014) was an American professor of biophysics and neurobiology at the University of California Berkeley. He graduated with his PhD in physics from Columbia University in 1963.

== Experimental method ==
The Morris–Lecar experiments relied on the voltage clamp method established by Keynes et al. (1973).

Large specimens of the barnacle Balanus nubilus (Pacific Bio-Marine Laboratories Inc., Venice, California) were used. The barnacle was sawed into lateral halves, and the depressor scutorum rostralis muscles were carefully exposed. Individual fibers were dissected, the incision starting from the tendon. The other end of the muscle was cut close to its attachment on the shell and ligatured. Isolated fibers were either used immediately or kept for up to 30 min in standard artificial seawater (ASW; see below) before use. Experiments were carried out at room temperature of 22 C.

== Principal assumptions ==
Among the principal assumptions are these:

1. Equations apply to a spatially iso-potential patch of membrane. There are two persistent (non-inactivating) voltage-gated currents with oppositively biased reversal potentials. The depolarizing current is carried by Na+ or Ca2+ ions (or both), depending on the system to be modeled, and the hyperpolarizing current is carried by K+.
2. Activation gates follow changes in membrane potential sufficiently rapidly that the activating conductance can instantaneously relax to its steady-state value at any voltage.
3. The dynamics of the recovery variable can be approximated by a first-order linear differential equation for the probability of channel opening.

== Physiological description ==
The Morris–Lecar model is a two-dimensional system of nonlinear differential equations. It is considered a simplified model compared to the four-dimensional Hodgkin–Huxley model.

Qualitatively, this system of equations describes the complex relationship between membrane potential and the activation of ion channels within the membrane: the potential depends on the activity of the ion channels, and the activity of the ion channels depends on the voltage. As bifurcation parameters are altered, different classes of neuron behavior are exhibited. τ_{N} is associated with the relative time scales of the firing dynamics, which varies broadly from cell to cell and exhibits significant temperature dependency.

Quantitatively:

$$\begin{align}
C \frac{dV}{dt} & ~=~ I - g_\mathrm{L} (V-V_\mathrm{L}) - g_\mathrm{Ca} M_\mathrm{ss} (V-V_\mathrm{Ca}) - g_\mathrm{K} N (V-V_\mathrm{K}) \\[5pt]
\frac{dN}{dt} & ~=~ \frac{N_\mathrm{ss}-N}{\tau_N}
\end{align}$$

where

$$\begin{align}
M_\mathrm{ss} & ~=~ \frac{1}{2} \cdot \left(1 + \tanh \left[\frac{V-V_1}{V_2} \right]\right) \\[5pt]
N_\mathrm{ss} & ~=~ \frac{1}{2} \cdot \left(1 + \tanh \left[\frac{V-V_3}{V_4} \right]\right) \\[5pt]
\tau_N & ~=~ 1 / \left( \varphi \cosh \left[\frac{V-V_3}{2V_4} \right] \right)
\end{align}$$

Note that the M_{ss} and N_{ss} equations may also be expressed as M_{ss} = (1 + exp[−2(V − V_{1}) / V_{2}])^{−1} and N_{ss} = (1 + exp[−2(V − V_{3}) / V_{4}])^{−1}, however most authors prefer the form using the hyperbolic functions.

=== Variables ===
- V : membrane potential
- N : recovery variable: the probability that the K+ channel is conducting

=== Parameters and constants ===
- I : applied current
- C : membrane capacitance
- g_{L}, g_{Ca}, g_{K} : leak, Ca^{++}, and K^{+} conductances through membranes channel
- V_{L}, V_{Ca}, V_{K} : equilibrium potential of relevant ion channels
- V_{1}, V_{2}, V_{3}, V_{4}: tuning parameters for steady state and time constant
- φ: reference frequency

== Bifurcations ==
Bifurcation in the Morris–Lecar model have been analyzed with the applied current I, as the main bifurcation parameter and φ, g_{Ca}, V_{3}, V_{4} as secondary parameters for phase plane analysis.

Possible Bifurcations

Hopf Bifurcation

SNIC bifurcation

Homoclinic bifurcation

Current clamp simulations of the Morris–Lecar model. The injected current for the SNIC bifurcation and the homoclinic bifurcation is varied between 30 nA and 50 nA, while the current for the Hopf bifurcation is varied between 80nA and 100nA.

== See also ==
- Computational neuroscience
- Biological neuron model
- Hodgkin–Huxley model
- FitzHugh–Nagumo model
- Neural oscillations
- Nonlinear dynamics
- Quantitative models of the action potential
