= Saltatory conduction =

Propagation of action potentials along the myelinated axons of neurons

Action potential propagation in myelinated neurons is faster than in unmyelinated neurons because of saltatory conduction.

Saltatory conduction occurs only on myelinated axons.

Propagation of action potential along myelinated nerve fiber

In neuroscience, saltatory conduction (from Latin saltus 'leap, jump') is the propagation of action potentials along myelinated axons from one node of Ranvier to the next, increasing the conduction velocity of action potentials. The uninsulated nodes of Ranvier are the only places along the axon where ions are exchanged across the axon membrane, regenerating the action potential between regions of the axon that are insulated by myelin, unlike electrical conduction in a simple circuit.

== Mechanism ==
Myelinated axons only allow action potentials to occur at the unmyelinated nodes of Ranvier that occur between the myelinated internodes. It is by this restriction that saltatory conduction propagates an action potential along the axon of a neuron at rates significantly higher than would be possible in unmyelinated axons (150 m/s compared from 0.5 to 10 m/s). As sodium rushes into the node it creates an electrical force which pushes on the ions already inside the axon. This rapid conduction of electrical signal reaches the next node and creates another action potential, thus refreshing the signal. In this way, electrical nerve signals can propagate rapidly, over long distances, without degradation. Although the action potential appears to jump along the axon, this phenomenon is actually just the rapid conduction of the signal inside the myelinated portion of the axon. If the entire surface of an axon were insulated, action potentials could not be regenerated along the axon resulting in signal degradation. In the CNS, nerve cells have been shown to individually alter the size of the nodes to tune conduction speeds.

== Energy efficiency ==
In addition to increasing the speed of the nerve impulse, the myelin sheath helps in reducing energy expenditure over the axon membrane as a whole, because the amount of sodium and potassium ions that need to be pumped to bring the concentrations back to the resting state following each action potential is decreased.

== Distribution ==
Saltatory conduction occurs widely in the myelinated nerve fibers of vertebrates, but was later discovered in a pair of medial myelinated giant fibers of Fenneropenaeus chinensis and Marsupenaeus japonicus shrimp, as well as in a median giant fiber of an earthworm. Saltatory conduction has also been found in the small- and medium-sized myelinated fibers of Penaeus shrimp.

== History of research ==
In 1925 Ralph S. Lillie proposed the mechanism of saltatory conduction after experimenting with an iron wire model of the nerve, after covering the wire with isolated sections akin to myelinated internodes he observed a faster and "saltatory" conduction.

In 1939, Ichiji Tasaki confirmed saltatory conduction through experiments on isolated single-nerve fibers of the Japanese Toad. Tasaki was experimenting with anaesthetics and noticed a lack of conduction when three or more nodes were anesthetized, leading to his hypothesis. During World War II, Tasaki was not able to publish in American journals and had to send manuscripts to Germany via the Siberian railroad. He only heard of their publication after the war ended.

Lillie's hypothesis was also confirmed by Andrew Huxley and Robert Stämpfli in peripheral myelinated nerve fibers in 1949 through experiments with isolated frog nerves. Bernhard Frankenhaeuser proved that this was true in undissected frog nerves as well, ending scholarly debate.

== See also ==
- Bioelectrochemistry
- Cable theory
- Electrophysiology
- Ephaptic coupling – Form of nervous system communication
- GHK current equation – Expression of the ionic flux across a cell membrane
- Goldman equation – Generalization of the Nernst equation for the membrane potential
- Hindmarsh–Rose model – Of the spiking-bursting behavior of a neuron
- Hodgkin–Huxley model – Describes how neurons transmit electric signals
- Neurotransmission – Impulse transmission between neurons
- Patch clamp – Laboratory technique in electrophysiology
- Quantitative models of the action potential
- Myelination – Formation of myelin sheaths in the nervous system
