= David E. Goldman =

David E. Goldman (David Eliot Goldman, 1910–1998) was a scientist famous for the Goldman equation which he derived for his doctorate degree in 1943 at Columbia University working with Kenneth Cole.

In the 1950s, while employed by the United States Navy, he was part of the CHABA (Committee on hearing and bioacoustics) team, which looked at the human effects of high-intensity noise. He became an early proponent of protection against loud noise and vibration. His son Dr. James Eliot Goldman is a scientist and neuropathologist.

== See also ==
- Long-term exposure to environmental noise
- GHK flux equation
