= Ichiji Tasaki =

Japanese-American biophysicist (1910–2009)

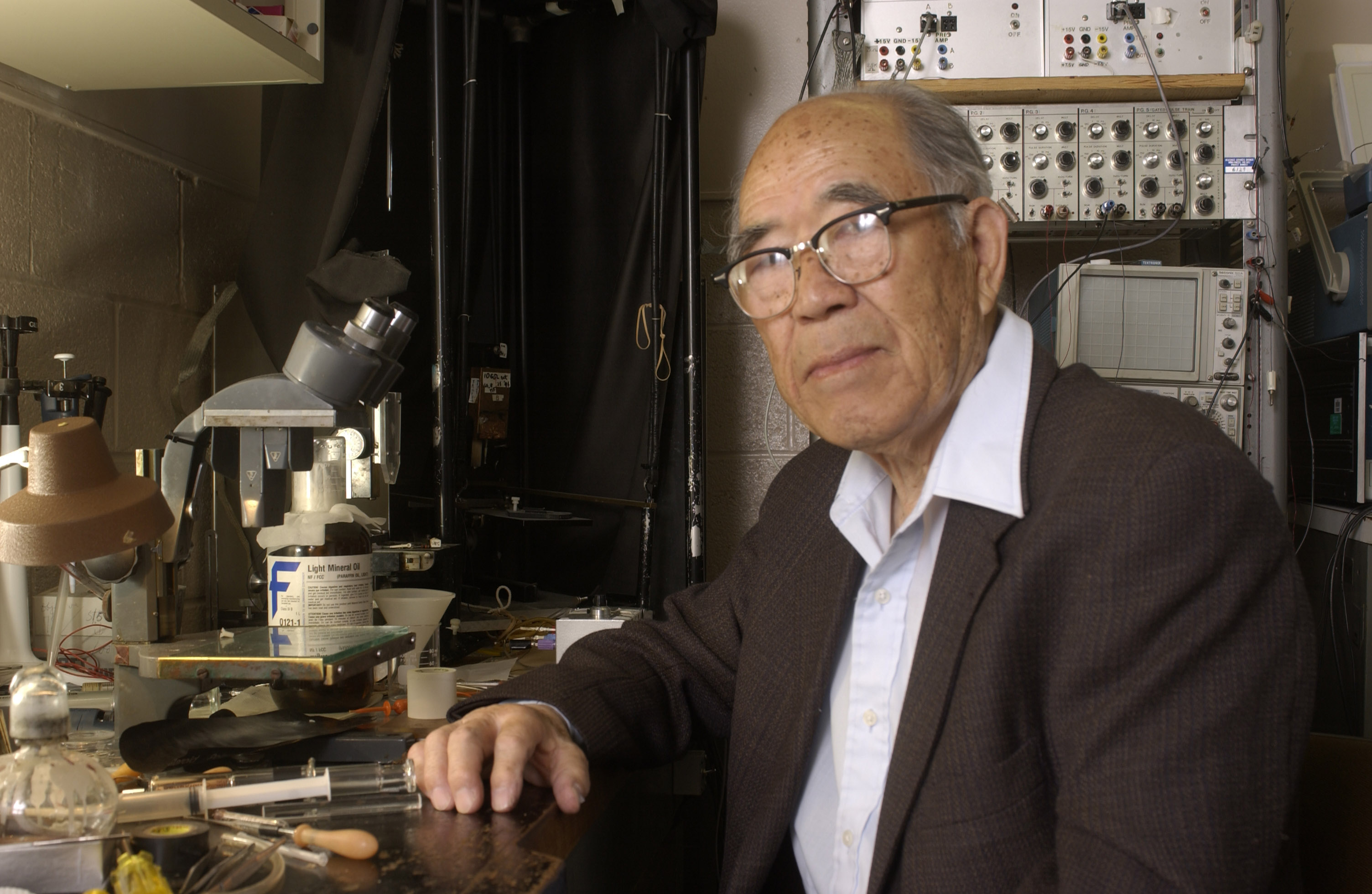
Dr. Tasaki in 2000

Ichiji Tasaki (田崎 一二, Tasaki Ichiji; October 10, 1910 – January 4, 2009) was a Japanese-born American biophysicist and physician involved in research relating to the electrical impulses in the nervous system.

Tasaki is credited with discovering the insulating function of the myelin sheath. His discoveries provided the foundation for a better understanding of diseases such as multiple sclerosis, in which myelin is lost or damaged.

== Early life and education ==
In 1910, Tasaki was born in Japan. Here and at the urging of his mother, he attended medical school, from which he received his M.D. in 1938. Rather than practising medicine, however, Tasaki decided to pursue his first love; biophysics.

== Career ==
While in Japan, he studied vertebrate nerve fibers and discovered the insulating function of the myelin sheath, a material that speeds the conduction of nerve impulses. He also was the first to show that electrical impulses traveling along myelinated nerve cells actually "jump" between the breaks in the myelin wrapping, called nodes of Ranvier. This process, termed saltatory conduction, is featured in a majority of physiology textbooks.

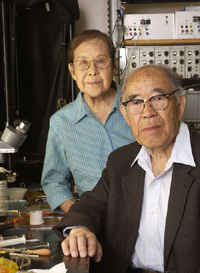
Dr. Ichiji Tasaki with his late wife and collaborator, Nobuko.

After World War II, Tasaki's research took him to England and to Switzerland, where he further studied the properties of nerve fibers. In 1951, he came to the United States to work at Washington University in St. Louis. While there, Tasaki and his colleagues demonstrated how vibrations that occur in the cochlea in response to sound are translated into electrical signals that the brain can interpret. This effort led to the development of the field of audiology, indirectly providing the basis for diagnosing and treating many hearing disorders.

== Research interests ==
Tasaki began his career at the National Institutes of Health in 1953, at NINDS, then called the National Institute of Neurological Disorders and Blindness. In 1957, he became a naturalized U.S. citizen.

Later, he moved to the NIMH, where he was a lab chief for 22 years. At the time of his death, he was on detail to the Eunice Kennedy Shriver National Institute of Child Health and Human Development. Since coming to NIH, Tasaki studied the physical and chemical processes that occur in nerve membranes.
