= Nernst–Planck equation =

Equation used to calculate the electromigration of ions in a fluid

The Nernst–Planck equation is a conservation of mass equation used to describe the motion of a charged chemical species in a fluid medium. It extends Fick's law of diffusion for the case where the diffusing particles are also moved with respect to the fluid by electrostatic forces. It is named after Walther Nernst and Max Planck.

== Equation ==
Mass transfer of an electrochemical species is described by three mechanisms. Diffusion mass transfer originates from Brownian motion of the dissolved species where local concentration differences tend toward average concentration of the entire electrolyte. Migration is caused by the applied electric field forcing charged species toward their respective electrodes. Convection arises from the flow of the fluid itself.

The Nernst–Planck equation is a continuity equation for the time-dependent concentration $c(t,{\bf x})$ of a chemical species:

$${\partial c\over{\partial t}} + \nabla \cdot {\bf J} = 0$$

where ${\bf J}$ is the flux. It is assumed that the total flux is composed of three elements: diffusion, advection, and electromigration. This implies that the concentration is affected by an ionic concentration gradient $\nabla c$, flow velocity ${\bf v}$, and an electric field ${\bf E}$:

$${\bf J} = -\underbrace{D\nabla c}_{\text{Diffusion}} + \underbrace{c{\bf v}}_{\text{Advection}} +\underbrace{{Dze\over{k_\text{B}T}}c{\bf E}}_{\text{Electromigration}}$$

where $D$ is the diffusivity of the chemical species, $z$ is the valence of ionic species, $e$ is the elementary charge, $k_\text{B}$ is the Boltzmann constant, and $T$ is the absolute temperature. The electric field may be further decomposed as:

$${\bf E} = -\nabla \phi - {\partial {\bf A}\over{\partial t}}$$

where $\phi$ is the electric potential and ${\bf A}$ is the magnetic vector potential. Therefore, the Nernst–Planck equation is given by:

$\frac{\partial c}{\partial t} = \nabla \cdot \left[ D\nabla c - c\mathbf{v} + \frac{Dze}{k_\text{B}T} c \left( \nabla \phi + {\partial {\bf A}\over{\partial t}} \right) \right]$

=== Simplifications ===
Assuming that the concentration is at equilibrium $(\partial c/\partial t = 0)$ and the flow velocity is zero, meaning that only the ion species moves, the Nernst–Planck equation takes the form:

$$\nabla \cdot \left\{ D\left[\nabla c + {ze\over{k_\text{B}T}}c \left( \nabla \phi + {\partial {\bf A}\over{\partial t}} \right) \right] \right\} = 0$$

Rather than a general electric field, if we assume that only the electrostatic component is significant, the equation is further simplified by removing the time derivative of the magnetic vector potential:

$$\nabla \cdot \left[ D\left(\nabla c + {ze\over{k_\text{B}T}}c \nabla \phi \right) \right] = 0$$

Finally, in units of mol/(m^{2}·s) and the gas constant $R$, one obtains the more familiar form:

$$\nabla \cdot \left[ D\left(\nabla c + {zF\over{RT}}c \nabla \phi \right) \right] = 0$$

where $F$ is the Faraday constant equal to $N_\text{A}e$; the product of Avogadro constant and the elementary charge.

== Applications ==
Modelling the transport of charged chemical species, such as ions, in porous media is of great interest for many applications such as for electrochemical devices and nanoparticle movement in the subsurface. This can be achieved by solving the Nernst–Planck, Flow, and charge conservation equations. In fact, the Nernst–Planck equation is applied in describing the ion-exchange kinetics in soils. It has also been applied to membrane electrochemistry.

== See also ==
- Goldman–Hodgkin–Katz equation
- Bioelectrochemistry
