= Reversal potential =

Membrane potential at which ionic current reverses

In a biological membrane, the reversal potential is the membrane potential at which the direction of ionic current reverses. At the reversal potential, there is no net flow of ions from one side of the membrane to the other. For channels that are permeable to only a single type of ion, the reversal potential is identical to the equilibrium potential of the ion.

== Equilibrium potential ==
The equilibrium potential for an ion is the membrane potential at which there is no net movement of the ion. The flow of any inorganic ion, such as Na^{+} or K^{+}, through an ion channel (since membranes are normally impermeable to ions) is driven by the electrochemical gradient for that ion. This gradient consists of two parts, the difference in the concentration of that ion across the membrane, and the voltage gradient. When these two influences balance each other, the electrochemical gradient for the ion is zero and there is no net flow of the ion through the channel; this also translates to no current across the membrane so long as only one ionic species is involved. The voltage gradient at which this equilibrium is reached is the equilibrium potential for the ion and it can be calculated from the Nernst equation.

=== Mathematical models and the driving force ===
We can consider as an example a positively charged ion, such as K^{+}, and a negatively charged membrane, as it is commonly the case in most organisms. The membrane voltage opposes the flow of the potassium ions out of the cell and the ions can leave the interior of the cell only if they have sufficient thermal energy to overcome the energy barrier produced by the negative membrane voltage. However, this biasing effect can be overcome by an opposing concentration gradient if the interior concentration is high enough which favours the potassium ions leaving the cell.

An important concept related to the equilibrium potential is the driving force. Driving force is simply defined as the difference between the actual membrane potential and an ion's equilibrium potential $V_\mathrm{m}-E_\mathrm{i}\$where $E_\mathrm{i}\$refers to the equilibrium potential for a specific ion. Relatedly, the membrane current per unit area due to the type $i$ ion channel is given by the following equation:

$$i_\mathrm{i} = g_\mathrm{i} \left(V_\mathrm{m}-E_\mathrm{i}\right)$$

where $V_\mathrm{m}-E_\mathrm{i}\$ is the driving force and $g_\mathrm{i}$ is the specific conductance, or conductance per unit area. Note that the ionic current will be zero if the membrane is impermeable to that ion in question or if the membrane voltage is exactly equal to the equilibrium potential of that ion.

== Use in research ==
When V_{m} is at the reversal potential for an event such as a synaptic potential (V_{m} − E_{rev} is equal to 0), the identity of the ions that flow during an EPC can be deduced by comparing the reversal potential of the EPC to the equilibrium potential for various ions. For instance several excitatory ionotropic ligand-gated neurotransmitter receptors including glutamate receptors (AMPA, NMDA, and kainate), nicotinic acetylcholine (nACh), and serotonin (5-HT_{3}) receptors are nonselective cation channels that pass Na^{+} and K^{+} in nearly equal proportions, giving the reversal potential close to zero. The inhibitory ionotropic ligand-gated neurotransmitter receptors that carry Cl^{−}, such as GABA_{A} and glycine receptors, have reversal potentials close to the resting potential (approximately −70 mV) in neurons.

This line of reasoning led to the development of experiments (by Akira Takeuchi and Noriko Takeuchi in 1960) that demonstrated that acetylcholine-activated ion channels are approximately equally permeable to Na^{+} and K^{+} ions. The experiment was performed by lowering the external Na^{+} concentration, which lowers (makes more negative) the Na^{+} equilibrium potential and produces a negative shift in reversal potential. Conversely, increasing the external K^{+} concentration raises (makes more positive) the K^{+} equilibrium potential and produces a positive shift in reversal potential. A general expression for reversal potential of synaptic events, including for decreases in conductance, has been derived.

== See also ==
- Electrochemical potential
- Cell potential
- Goldman equation
