= Hodgkin–Huxley model =

Describes how neurons transmit electric signals

Basic components of Hodgkin–Huxley-type models which represent the biophysical characteristic of cell membranes. The lipid bilayer is poised as one can say as a capacitance (C_{m}). Voltage-gated and leak ion channels are represented by nonlinear (g_{n}) and linear (g_{L}) conductances, respectively. The electrochemical gradients driving the flow of ions are represented by batteries (E), and ion pumps and exchangers are represented by current sources (I_{p}).

The Hodgkin–Huxley model, or conductance-based model, is a mathematical model that shows why and how action potentials in neurons are initiated and propagated. It is a set of nonlinear differential equations that approximates the electrical engineering characteristics of excitable cells such as neurons and muscle cells. It is a continuous-time dynamical system.

Alan Hodgkin and Andrew Huxley described the model in 1952 to explain the ionic mechanisms underlying the initiation and propagation of action potentials in the squid giant axon. They received the 1963 Nobel Prize in Physiology or Medicine for this work.

== Basic components ==
The typical Hodgkin–Huxley model treats each component of an excitable cell as an electrical element (as shown in the figure). The lipid bilayer is represented as a capacitance (C_{m}). Voltage-gated ion channels are represented by electrical conductances (g_{n}, where n is the specific ion channel) that depend on both voltage and time. Leak channels are represented by linear conductances (g_{L}). The electrochemical gradients driving the flow of ions are represented by voltage sources (E_{n}) whose voltages are determined by the ratio of the intra- and extracellular concentrations of the ionic species of interest. Finally, ion pumps are represented by current sources (I_{p}). The membrane potential is denoted by V_{m}.

Mathematically, the current flowing into the capacitance of the lipid bilayer is written as

$$I_c = C_m\frac{{\mathrm d} V_m}{{\mathrm d} t}$$

and the current through a given ion channel is the product of that channel's conductance and the driving potential for the specific ion

$$I_i = {g_i}(V_m - V_i) \;$$

where $V_i$ is the reversal potential of the specific ion channel. Thus, for a cell with sodium and potassium channels, the total current through the membrane is given by:

$$I = C_m\frac{{\mathrm d} V_m}{{\mathrm d} t}  + g_K(V_m - V_K) + g_{Na}(V_m - V_{Na}) + g_l(V_m - V_l)$$

where I is the total membrane current per unit area, C_{m} is the membrane capacitance per unit area, g_{K} and g_{Na} are the potassium and sodium conductances per unit area, respectively, V_{K} and V_{Na} are the potassium and sodium reversal potentials, respectively, and g_{l} and V_{l} are the leak conductance per unit area and leak reversal potential, respectively. The time dependent elements of this equation are V_{m}, g_{Na}, and g_{K}, where the last two conductances depend explicitly on the membrane voltage (V_{m}) as well.

== Ionic current characterization ==
In voltage-gated ion channels, the channel conductance is a function of both time and voltage ($g_n(t,V)$ in the figure), while in leak channels, $g_l$, it is a constant ($g_L$ in the figure). The current generated by ion pumps is dependent on the ionic species specific to that pump. The following sections will describe these formulations in more detail.

=== Voltage-gated ion channels ===
Using a series of voltage clamp experiments and by varying extracellular sodium and potassium concentrations, Hodgkin and Huxley developed a model in which the properties of an excitable cell are described by a set of four ordinary differential equations. Together with the equation for the total current mentioned above, these are:

$$I = C_m\frac{{\mathrm d} V_m}{{\mathrm d} t}  + \bar{g}_\text{K}n^4(V_m - V_K) + \bar{g}_\text{Na}m^3h(V_m - V_{Na}) + \bar{g}_l(V_m - V_l),$$

$$\frac{dn}{dt} = \alpha_n(V_m)(1 - n) - \beta_n(V_m) n$$

$$\frac{dm}{dt} = \alpha_m(V_m)(1 - m)  - \beta_m(V_m) m$$

$$\frac{dh}{dt} = \alpha_h(V_m)(1 - h) - \beta_h(V_m) h$$

where I is the current per unit area and $\alpha_i$ and $\beta_i$ are rate constants for the i-th ion channel, which depend on voltage but not time. $\bar{g}_n$ is the maximal value of the conductance. n, m, and h are dimensionless probabilities between 0 and 1 that are associated with potassium channel subunit activation, sodium channel subunit activation, and sodium channel subunit inactivation, respectively. For instance, given that potassium channels in squid giant axon are made up of four subunits which all need to be in the open state for the channel to allow the passage of potassium ions, the n needs to be raised to the fourth power. For $p = (n, m, h)$, $\alpha_p$ and $\beta_p$ take the form

$$\alpha_p(V_m) = p_\infty(V_m)/\tau_p$$

$$\beta_p(V_m) = (1 - p_\infty(V_m))/\tau_p.$$

$p_\infty$ and $(1-p_\infty)$ are the steady frontal values for activation and inactivation, respectively, and are usually represented by Boltzmann equations as functions of $V_m$. In the original paper by Hodgkin and Huxley, the functions $\alpha$ and $\beta$ are given by

$$\begin{array}{lll}
\alpha_n(V_m) = \frac{0.01(10-V)}{\exp\big(\frac{10-V}{10}\big)-1} & \alpha_m(V_m) = \frac{0.1(25-V)}{\exp\big(\frac{25-V}{10}\big)-1} & \alpha_h(V_m) = 0.07\exp\bigg(-\frac{V}{20}\bigg)\\
\beta_n(V_m) = 0.125\exp\bigg(-\frac{V}{80}\bigg) &  \beta_m(V_m) = 4\exp\bigg(-\frac{V}{18}\bigg) & \beta_h(V_m) = \frac{1}{\exp\big(\frac{30-V}{10}\big) + 1}
\end{array}$$

where $V = V_{rest} - V_m$ denotes the negative depolarization in mV.

In many current software programs Hodgkin–Huxley type models generalize $\alpha$ and $\beta$ to

$$\frac{A_p(V_m-B_p)}{\exp\big(\frac{V_m-B_p}{C_p}\big)-D_p}$$

In order to characterize voltage-gated channels, the equations can be fitted to voltage clamp data. For a derivation of the Hodgkin–Huxley equations under voltage-clamp, see. Briefly, when the membrane potential is held at a constant value (i.e., with a voltage clamp), for each value of the membrane potential the nonlinear gating equations reduce to equations of the form:

$$m(t) = m_{0} - [ (m_{0}-m_{\infty})(1 - e^{-t/\tau_m})]\,$$

$$h(t) = h_{0} - [ (h_{0}-h_{\infty})(1 - e^{-t/\tau_h})]\,$$

$$n(t) = n_{0} - [ (n_{0}-n_{\infty})(1 - e^{-t/\tau_n})]\,$$

Thus, for every value of membrane potential $V_{m}$ the sodium and potassium currents can be described by

$$I_\mathrm{Na}(t)=\bar{g}_\mathrm{Na} m(V_m)^3h(V_m)(V_m-E_\mathrm{Na}),$$

$$I_\mathrm{K}(t)=\bar{g}_\mathrm{K} n(V_m)^4(V_m-E_\mathrm{K}).$$

In order to arrive at the complete solution for a propagated action potential, one must write the current term I on the left-hand side of the first differential equation in terms of V, so that the equation becomes an equation for voltage alone. The relation between I and V can be derived from cable theory and is given by

$$I = \frac{a}{2R}\frac{\partial^2V}{\partial x^2},$$

where a is the radius of the axon, R is the specific resistance of the axoplasm, and x is the position along the nerve fiber. Substitution of this expression for I transforms the original set of equations into a set of partial differential equations, because the voltage becomes a function of both x and t.

The Levenberg–Marquardt algorithm is often used to fit these equations to voltage-clamp data.

While the original experiments involved only sodium and potassium channels, the Hodgkin–Huxley model can also be extended to account for other species of ion channels.

=== Leak channels ===
Leak channels account for the natural permeability of the membrane to ions and take the form of the equation for voltage-gated channels, where the conductance $g_{leak}$ is a constant. Thus, the leak current due to passive leak ion channels in the Hodgkin-Huxley formalism is $I_l=g_{leak}(V-V_{leak})$.

=== Pumps and exchangers ===
The membrane potential depends upon the maintenance of ionic concentration gradients across it. The maintenance of these concentration gradients requires active transport of ionic species. The sodium-potassium and sodium-calcium exchangers are the best known of these. Some of the basic properties of the Na/Ca exchanger have already been well-established: the stoichiometry of exchange is 3 Na^{+}: 1 Ca^{2+} and the exchanger is electrogenic and voltage-sensitive. The Na/K exchanger has also been described in detail, with a 3 Na^{+}: 2 K^{+} stoichiometry.

== Mathematical properties ==
The Hodgkin–Huxley model can be thought of as a differential equation system with four state variables, $V_m(t), n(t), m(t)$, and $h(t)$, that change with respect to time $t$. The system is difficult to study because it is a nonlinear system, cannot be solved analytically, and therefore has no closed-form solution. However, there are many numerical methods available to analyze the system. Certain properties and general behaviors, such as limit cycles, can be proven to exist.

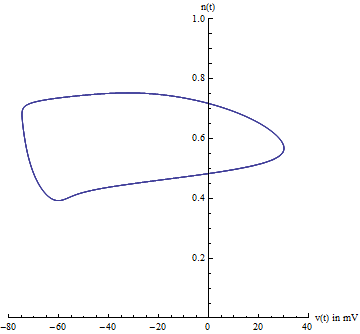
A simulation of the Hodgkin–Huxley model in phase space, in terms of voltage v(t) and potassium gating variable n(t). The closed curve is known as a limit cycle.

=== Center manifold ===
Because there are four state variables, visualizing the path in phase space can be difficult. Usually two variables are chosen, voltage $V_m(t)$ and the potassium gating variable $n(t)$, allowing one to visualize the limit cycle. However, one must be careful because this is an ad-hoc method of visualizing the 4-dimensional system. This does not prove the existence of the limit cycle.

A better projection can be constructed from a careful analysis of the Jacobian of the system, evaluated at the equilibrium point. Specifically, the eigenvalues of the Jacobian are indicative of the center manifold's existence. Likewise, the eigenvectors of the Jacobian reveal the center manifold's orientation. The Hodgkin–Huxley model has two negative eigenvalues and two complex eigenvalues with slightly positive real parts. The eigenvectors associated with the two negative eigenvalues will reduce to zero as time t increases. The remaining two complex eigenvectors define the center manifold. In other words, the 4-dimensional system collapses onto a 2-dimensional plane. Any solution starting off the center manifold will decay towards the center manifold. Furthermore, the limit cycle is contained on the center manifold.

The voltage v(t) (in millivolts) of the Hodgkin–Huxley model, graphed over 50 milliseconds. The injected current varies from −5 nanoamps to 12 nanoamps. The graph passes through three stages: an equilibrium stage, a single-spike stage, and a limit cycle stage.

=== Bifurcations ===
If the injected current $I$ were used as a bifurcation parameter, then the Hodgkin–Huxley model undergoes a Hopf bifurcation. As with most neuronal models, increasing the injected current will increase the firing rate of the neuron. One consequence of the Hopf bifurcation is that there is a minimum firing rate. This means that either the neuron is not firing at all (corresponding to zero frequency), or firing at the minimum firing rate. Because of the all-or-none principle, there is no smooth increase in action potential amplitude, but rather there is a sudden "jump" in amplitude. The resulting transition is known as a canard.

== Improvements and alternative models ==
The Hodgkin–Huxley model is regarded as one of the great achievements of 20th-century biophysics. Nevertheless, modern Hodgkin–Huxley-type models have been extended in several important ways:

- Additional ion channel populations have been incorporated based on experimental data.
- The Hodgkin–Huxley model has been modified to incorporate transition state theory and produce thermodynamic Hodgkin–Huxley models.
- Models often incorporate highly complex geometries of dendrites and axons, often based on microscopy data.
- Stochastic models of ion-channel behavior, leading to stochastic hybrid systems.
- The Poisson–Nernst–Planck (PNP) model is based on a mean-field approximation of ion interactions and continuum descriptions of concentration and electrostatic potential.

Several simplified neuronal models have also been developed (such as the FitzHugh–Nagumo model), facilitating efficient large-scale simulation of groups of neurons, as well as mathematical insight into dynamics of action potential generation.

== Relation to transcriptomics ==
Ion-channel parameters derived from Hodgkin–Huxley-type models fitted to single-cell electrophysiological data have been shown to correlate with single-cell transcriptomic profiles across neuronal cell types, underscoring the biological realism of such models.

== See also ==
- Anode break excitation
- Autowave
- Neural circuit
- GHK flux equation
- Goldman equation
- Memristor
- Neural accommodation
- Reaction–diffusion
- Theta model
- Rulkov map
- Chialvo map
