= Goldman–Hodgkin–Katz flux equation =

Expression of the ionic flux across a cell membrane

The Goldman–Hodgkin–Katz flux equation (or GHK flux equation or GHK current density equation) describes the ionic flux across a cell membrane as a function of the transmembrane potential and the concentrations of the ion inside and outside of the cell. Since both the voltage and the concentration gradients influence the movement of ions, this process is a simplified version of electrodiffusion. Electrodiffusion is most accurately defined by the Nernst–Planck equation and the GHK flux equation is a solution to the Nernst–Planck equation with the assumptions listed below.

== Origin ==
The American David E. Goldman of Columbia University, and the English Nobel laureates Alan Lloyd Hodgkin and Bernard Katz derived this equation.

== Assumptions ==
Several assumptions are made in deriving the GHK flux equation (Hille 2001, p. 445) :

- The membrane is a homogeneous substance
- The electrical field is constant so that the transmembrane potential varies linearly across the membrane
- The ions access the membrane instantaneously from the intra- and extracellular solutions
- The permeant ions do not interact
- The movement of ions is affected by both concentration and voltage differences

== Equation ==
The GHK flux equation for an ion S (Hille 2001, p. 445):

$$\Phi_{S} = P_{S}z_{S}^2\frac{V_{m}F^{2}}{RT}\frac{[\mbox{S}]_{i} - [\mbox{S}]_{o}\exp(-z_{S}V_{m}F/RT)}{1 - \exp(-z_{S}V_{m}F/RT)}$$

where

- $\Phi$_{S} is the current density (flux) outward through the membrane carried by ion S, measured in amperes per square meter (A·m^{−2})
- P_{S} is the permeability of the membrane for ion S measured in m·s^{−1}
- z_{S} is the valence of ion S
- V_{m} is the transmembrane potential in volts
- F is the Faraday constant, equal to 96,485 C·mol^{−1} or J·V^{−1}·mol^{−1}
- R is the gas constant, equal to 8.314 J·K^{−1}·mol^{−1}
- T is the absolute temperature, measured in kelvins (= degrees Celsius + 273.15)
- [S]_{i} is the intracellular concentration of ion S, measured in mol·m^{−3} or mmol·l^{−1}
- [S]_{o} is the extracellular concentration of ion S, measured in mol·m^{−3}

== Implicit definition of reversal potential ==
The reversal potential is shown to be contained in the GHK flux equation (Flax 2008). The proof is replicated from the reference (Flax 2008) here.

We wish to show that when the flux is zero, the transmembrane potential is not zero. Formally it is written $\lim_{\Phi_{S}\rightarrow0} V_{m}\ne0$ which is equivalent to writing $\lim_{V_{m}\rightarrow0} \Phi_{S}\ne0$, which states that when the transmembrane potential is zero, the flux is not zero.

However, due to the form of the GHK flux equation when $V_{m}=0$, $\Phi_{S}=\frac{0}{0}$. This is a problem as the value of $\frac{0}{0}$ is indeterminate.

We turn to l'Hôpital's rule to find the solution for the limit:

$$\lim_{V_{m}\rightarrow0} \Phi_{S} = P_{S}\frac{z_{S}^2F^{2}}{RT}\frac{[V_{m}([\mbox{S}]_{i} - [\mbox{S}]_{o}\exp(-z_{S}V_{m}F/RT))]'}{[1 - \exp(-z_{S}V_{m}F/RT)]'}$$

where $[f]'$ represents the differential of f and the result is :

$$\lim_{V_{m}\rightarrow0} \Phi_{S} = P_{S}z_{S}F([\mbox{S}]_{i} - [\mbox{S}]_{o})$$

It is evident from the previous equation that when $V_{m}=0$, $\Phi_{S}\ne0$ if $([\mbox{S}]_{i} - [\mbox{S}]_{o})\ne0$ and thus

$$\lim_{\Phi_{S}\rightarrow0}V_{m}\ne0$$

which is the definition of the reversal potential.

By setting $\Phi_{S}=0$ we can also obtain the reversal potential :

$$\Phi_{S}=0=P_{S}\frac{z_{S}^2F^{2}}{RT}\frac{V_{m}([\mbox{S}]_{i} - [\mbox{S}]_{o}\exp(-z_{S}V_{m}F/RT))}{1 - \exp(-z_{S}V_{m}F/RT)}$$

which reduces to :

$$[\mbox{S}]_{i} - [\mbox{S}]_{o}\exp(-z_{S}V_{m}F/RT)=0$$

and produces the Nernst equation :

$$V_{m}=-\frac{RT}{z_{S}F}\ln\left (\frac{[\mbox{S}]_{i}}{[\mbox{S}]_{o}}\right )$$

== Rectification ==
Since one of the assumptions of the GHK flux equation is that the ions move independently of each other, the total flow of ions across the membrane is simply equal to the sum of two oppositely directed fluxes. Each flux approaches an asymptotic value as the membrane potential diverges from zero. These asymptotes are

$$\Phi_{S|i\to o} = P_{S}z_{S}^2 \frac{V_{m}F^{2}}{RT}[\mbox{S}]_{i}\ \mbox{for}\ V_{m} \gg \; 0$$
$$\Phi_{S|i\to o} = 0 \; \mbox{for}\ V_{m} \ll \; 0$$

and

$$\Phi_{S|o\to i} = P_{S}z_{S}^2 \frac{V_{m}F^{2}}{RT}[\mbox{S}]_{o}\ \mbox{for}\ V_{m} \ll \; 0$$
$$\Phi_{S|o\to i} = 0 \; \mbox{for}\ V_{m} \gg \; 0$$

where subscripts 'i' and 'o' denote the intra- and extracellular compartments, respectively. Intuitively one may understand these limits as follows: if an ion is only found outside a cell, then the flux is Ohmic (proportional to voltage) when the voltage causes the ion to flow into the cell, but no voltage could cause the ion to flow out of the cell, since there are no ions inside the cell in the first place.

Keeping all terms except V_{m} constant, the equation yields a straight line when plotting $\Phi$_{S} against V_{m}. It is evident that the ratio between the two asymptotes is merely the ratio between the two concentrations of S, [S]_{i} and [S]_{o}. Thus, if the two concentrations are identical, the slope will be identical (and constant) throughout the voltage range (corresponding to Ohm's law scaled by the surface area). As the ratio between the two concentrations increases, so does the difference between the two slopes, meaning that the current is larger in one direction than the other, given an equal driving force of opposite signs. This is contrary to the result obtained if using Ohm's law scaled by the surface area, and the effect is called rectification.

The GHK flux equation is mostly used by electrophysiologists when the ratio between [S]_{i} and [S]_{o} is large and/or when one or both of the concentrations change considerably during an action potential. The most common example is probably intracellular calcium, [Ca^{2+}]_{i}, which during a cardiac action potential cycle can change 100-fold or more, and the ratio between [Ca^{2+}]_{o} and [Ca^{2+}]_{i} can reach 20,000 or more.

== See also ==
- Goldman equation
- Nernst equation
- Reversal potential
