= Theta model =

Dynamics of the theta model on the unit circle. Blue denotes a stable fixed point; Green denotes an unstable fixed point. By varying the input parameter, the two equilibria collide and form a stable limit cycle; Gray arrows indicate that the points are attracting in $\mathbb{R}^2$; Black arrows indicate the direction of movement along the unit circle.

The theta model, or Ermentrout–Kopell canonical model, is a biological neuron model originally developed to mathematically describe neurons in the animal Aplysia. The model is particularly well-suited to describe neural bursting, which is characterized by periodic transitions between rapid oscillations in the membrane potential followed by quiescence. This bursting behavior is often found in neurons responsible for controlling and maintaining steady rhythms such as breathing, swimming, and digesting. Of the three main classes of bursting neurons (square wave bursting, parabolic bursting, and elliptic bursting), the theta model describes parabolic bursting, which is characterized by a parabolic frequency curve during each burst.

The model consists of one variable that describes the membrane potential of a neuron along with an input current. The single variable of the theta model obeys relatively simple equations, allowing for analytic, or closed-form solutions, which are useful for understanding the properties of parabolic bursting neurons. In contrast, other biophysically accurate neural models such as the Hodgkin–Huxley model and Morris–Lecar model consist of multiple variables that cannot be solved analytically, requiring numerical integration to solve.

Similar models include the quadratic integrate and fire (QIF) model, which differs from the theta model only by a change of variables and Plant's model, which consists of Hodgkin–Huxley type equations and also differs from the theta model by a series of coordinate transformations.

Despite its simplicity, the theta model offers enough complexity in its dynamics that it has been used for a wide range of theoretical neuroscience research as well as in research beyond biology, such as in artificial intelligence.

== Background and history ==
A model of pre-Bötzinger complex (pBC) neuron. The pre-Bötzinger complex is a region in the brain stem responsible for maintaining breathing rhythms. This is an example of a square-wave burster. In a slice preparation of the pBC complex, the neurons burst periodically and synchronize as long as they receive a continual, external, noisy input.

Bursting is "an oscillation in which an observable [part] of the system, such as voltage or chemical concentration, changes periodically between an active phase of rapid spike oscillations (the fast sub-system) and a phase of quiescence". Bursting comes in three distinct forms: square-wave bursting, parabolic bursting, and elliptic bursting. There exist some models that do not fit neatly into these categories by qualitative observation, but it is possible to sort such models by their topology (i.e. such models can be sorted "by the structure of the fast subsystem").

All three forms of bursting are capable of beating and periodic bursting. Periodic bursting (or just bursting) is of more interest because many phenomena are controlled by, or arise from, bursting. For example, bursting due to a changing membrane potential is common in various neurons, including but not limited to cortical chattering neurons, thalamacortical neurons, and pacemaker neurons. Pacemakers in general are known to burst and synchronize as a population, thus generating a robust rhythm that can maintain repetitive tasks like breathing, walking, and eating. Beating occurs when a cell bursts continuously with no periodic quiescent periods, but beating is often considered to be an extreme case and is rarely of primary interest.

Bursting cells are important for motor generation and synchronization. For example, the pre-Bötzinger complex in the mammalian brain stem contains many bursting neurons that control autonomous breathing rhythms. Various neocortical neurons (i.e. cells of the neocortex) are capable of bursting, which "contribute significantly to [the] network behavior [of neocortical neurons]". The R15 neuron of the abdominal ganglion in Aplyisa, hypothesized to be a neurosecretory cell (i.e. a cell that produces hormones), is known to produce bursts characteristic of neurosecretory cells. In particular, it is known to produce parabolic bursts.

Since many biological processes involve bursting behavior, there is a wealth of various bursting models in scientific literature. For instance, there exist several models for interneurons and cortical spiking neurons. However, the literature on parabolic bursting models is relatively scarce.

Parabolic bursting models are mathematical models that mimic parabolic bursting in real biological systems. Each burst of a parabolic burster has a characteristic feature in the burst structure itself – the frequency at the beginning and end of the burst is low relative to the frequency in the middle of the burst. A frequency plot of one burst resembles a parabola, hence the name "parabolic burst". Furthermore, unlike elliptic or square-wave bursting, there is a slow modulating wave which, at its peak, excites the cell enough to generate a burst and inhibits the cell in regions near its minimum. As a result, the neuron periodically transitions between bursting and quiescence.

Parabolic bursting has been studied most extensively in the R15 neuron, which is one of six types of neurons of the Aplysia abdominal ganglion and one of thirty neurons comprising the abdominal ganglion. The Aplysia abdominal ganglion was studied and extensively characterized because its relatively large neurons and proximity of the neurons to the surface of the ganglion made it an ideal and "valuable preparation for cellular electrophysical studies".

Early attempts to model parabolic bursting were for specific applications, often related to studies of the R15 neuron. This is especially true of R. E. Plant and Carpenter, whose combined works comprise the bulk of parabolic bursting models prior to Ermentrout and Kopell's canonical model.

Though there was no specific mention of the term "parabolic bursting" in Plant's papers, Plant's model(s) do involve a slow, modulating oscillation which control bursting in the model(s). This is, by definition, parabolic bursting. Both of Plant's papers on the topic involve a model derived from the Hodgkin–Huxley equations and include extra conductances, which only add to the complexity of the model.

Carpenter developed her model primarily for a square wave burster. The model was capable of producing a small variety of square wave bursts and produced parabolic bursts as a consequence of adding an extra conductance. However, the model applied to only spatial propagation down axons and not situations where oscillations are limited to a small region in space (i.e. it was not suited for "space-clamped" situations).

The lack of a simple, generalizable, space-clamped, parabolic bursting model motivated Ermentrout and Kopell to develop the theta model.

== Characteristics of the model ==
=== General equations ===
It is possible to describe a multitude of parabolic bursting cells by deriving a simple mathematical model, called a canonical model. Derivation of the Ermentrout and Kopell canonical model begins with the general form for parabolic bursting, and notation will be fixed to clarify the discussion. The letters $f$, $g$, $h$, $I$ are reserved for functions; $x$, $y$, $\theta$ for state variables; $\varepsilon$, $p$, and $q$ for scalars.

In the following generalized system of equations for parabolic bursting, the values of $f$ describe the membrane potential and ion channels, typical of many conductance-based biological neuron models. Slow oscillations are controlled by $h$, and ultimately described by $y$. These slow oscillations can be, for example, slow fluctuations in calcium concentration inside a cell. The function $g$ couples $\dot{y}$ to $\dot{x}$, thereby allowing the second system, $\dot{y}$, to influence the behavior of the first system, $\dot{x}$. In more succinct terms, "$x$ generates the spikes and $y$ generates the slow waves". The equations are:

$$\dot{x} = f(x) + \varepsilon^2 g(x,y,\varepsilon),$$

$$\dot{y} = \varepsilon h(x,y,\varepsilon),$$

where $x$ is a vector with $p$ entries (i.e. $x \in \mathbb{R}^p$), $y$ is a vector with $q$ entries (i.e. $y \in \mathbb{R}^q$), $\varepsilon$ is small and positive, and $f$, $g$, $h$ are smooth (i.e. infinitely differentiable). Additional constraints are required to guarantee parabolic bursting. First, $\dot{x}=f(x)$ must produce a circle in phase space that is invariant, meaning it does not change under certain transformations. This circle must also be attracting in $\mathbb{R}^2$ with a critical point located at $x = 0$. The second criterion requires that when $\dot{y}=h(0,y,0)$, there exists a stable limit cycle solution. These criteria can be summarized by the following points:

1. When $\varepsilon = 0$, $\dot{x}=f(x)$ "has an attracting invariant circle with a single critical point", with the critical point located at $x=0$, and
2. When $x = 0$, $\dot{y}=h(0,y,0)$ has a stable limit cycle solution.

The theta model can be used in place of any parabolic bursting model that satisfies the assumptions above.

=== Model equations and properties ===
The theta model is a reduction of the generalized system from the previous section and takes the form,

$$\frac{d\theta}{dt}=1-\cos\theta+(1+\cos\theta)I(t), \qquad \theta \in S^1.$$

This model is one of the simplest excitable neuron models. The state variable $\theta$ represents the angle in radians, and the input function, $I(t)$, is typically chosen to be periodic. Whenever $\theta$ reaches the value $\theta = \pi$, the model is said to produce a spike.

The theta model is capable of a single saddle-node bifurcation and can be shown to be the "normal form for the saddle-node on a limit cycle bifurcation." When $(I < 0)$, the system is excitable, i.e., given an appriate perturbation the system will produce a spike. Incidentally, when viewed in the plane ($\mathbb{R}^2$), the unstable critical point is actually a saddle point because $S^1$ is attracting in $\mathbb{R}^2$. When $(I > 0)$, $\dot{\theta}$ is also positive, and the system will give rise to a limit cycle. Therefore, the bifurcation point is located at $I(t) = 0$.

Near the bifurcation point, the theta model resembles the quadratic integrate and fire model:

$$\frac{dx}{dt} = x^2 + I.$$

For I > 0, the solutions of this equation blow up in finite time. By resetting the trajectory $x(t)$ to $-\infty$ when it reaches $+\infty$, the total period is then

$T = \frac{\pi}{\sqrt{I}}.$ (true for both theta and QIF models)

Therefore, the period diverges as $I \rightarrow 0^+$ and the frequency converges to zero.

==== Example ====
When $I(t)$ is some slow wave which can be both negative and positive, the system is capable of producing parabolic bursts. Consider the simple example $I(t) := \sin(\alpha t)$, where $\alpha$ is relatively small. Then for $\alpha t \in (0, \pi)$, $I(t)$ is strictly positive and $\theta$ makes multiple passes through the angle $\pi$, resulting in multiple bursts. Note that whenever $\alpha t$ is near zero or $\pi$, the theta neuron will spike at a relatively low frequency, and whenever $\alpha t$ is near $\alpha t = \pi/2$ the neuron will spike with very high frequency. When $\alpha t = \pi$, the frequency of spikes is zero since the period is infinite since $\theta$ can no longer pass through $\theta = \pi$. Finally, for $\alpha t \in (\pi, 2\pi)$, the neuron is excitable and will no longer burst. This qualitative description highlights the characteristics that make the theta model a parabolic bursting model. Not only does the model have periods of quiescence between bursts which are modulated by a slow wave, but the frequency of spikes at the beginning and end of each burst is high relative to the frequency at the middle of the burst.

=== Derivation ===
The derivation comes in the form of two lemmas in Ermentrout and Kopell (1986). Lemma 1, in summary, states that when viewing the general equations above in a subset $S^1 \times \mathbb{R}^2$, the equations take the form:

$$\dot{x_1} = \overline{f}(x_1) + \varepsilon^2 \overline{g}(x_1, y, \varepsilon) \qquad x_1 \in S^1,$$

$$\dot{y} = \varepsilon \overline{h}(x_1, y, \varepsilon) \;\;\;\;\;\; y \in \mathbb{R}^q.$$

By lemma 2 in Ermentrout and Kopell 1986, "There exists a change of coordinates... and a constant, c, such that in new coordinates, the two equations above converge pointwise as $\varepsilon \rightarrow 0$ to the equations

$$\dot{\theta} = (1-\cos\theta) + (1 + \cos\theta)\overline{g}(0,y,0),$$

$$\dot{y} = \frac{1}{c} \overline{h}(0,y,0),$$

for all $\theta \neq \pi$. Convergence is uniform except near $\theta = \pi$." (Ermentrout and Kopell, 1986). By letting $I(t) := \overline{g}(0,y,0)$, resemblance to the theta model is obvious.

=== Phase response curve ===
The phase response curve of the theta model with K = 1. Since perturbations always result in a phase advance, this is a type 1 PRC.

In general, given a scalar phase model of the form

$$\dot{\theta} = f(\theta) + g(\theta)S(t),$$

where $S(t)$ represents the perturbation current, a closed form solution of the phase response curve (PRC) does not exist.

However, the theta model is a special case of such an oscillator and happens to have a closed-form solution for the PRC. The theta model is recovered by defining $f$ and $g$ as

$$f(\theta) = (1-\cos\theta) + I(1+\cos\theta),$$

$$g(\theta) = (1 + \cos\theta).$$

In the appendix of Ermentrout 1996, the PRC is shown to be $Z(\theta) = K(1+\cos\theta)$.

== Similar models ==
=== Plant's model ===
The authors of Soto-Treviño et al. (1996) discuss in great detail the similarities between Plant's (1976) model and the theta model. At first glance, the mechanisms of bursting in both systems are very different: In Plant's model, there are two slow oscillations – one for conductance of a specific current and one for the concentration of calcium. The calcium oscillations are active only when the membrane potential is capable of oscillating. This contrasts heavily against the theta model in which one slow wave modulates the burst of the neuron and the slow wave has no dependence upon the bursts. Despite these differences, the theta model is shown to be similar to Plant's (1976) model by a series of coordinate transformations. In the process, Soto-Trevino, et al. discovered that the theta model was more general than originally believed.

=== Quadratic integrate-and-fire ===
The quadratic integrate-and-fire (QIF) model was created by Latham et al. in 2000 to explore the many questions related to networks of neurons with low firing rates. It was unclear to Latham et al. why networks of neurons with "standard" parameters were unable to generate sustained low frequency firing rates, while networks with low firing rates were often seen in biological systems.

According to Gerstner and Kistler (2002), the quadratic integrate-and-fire (QIF) model is given by the following differential equation:

$$\tau \dot{u} = a_0(u-u_\text{rest})(u-u_c) + R_m I,$$

where $a_0$ is a strictly positive scalar, $u$ is the membrane potential, $u_\text{rest}$ is the resting potential $u_c$ is the minimum potential necessary for the membrane to produce an action potential, $R_m$ is the membrane resistance, $\tau$ the membrane time constant and $u_c > u_\text{rest}$. When there is no input current (i.e. $I = 0$), the membrane potential quickly returns to rest following a perturbation. When the input current, $I$, is large enough, the membrane potential ($u$) surpasses its firing threshold and rises rapidly (indeed, it reaches arbitrarily large values in finite time); this represents the peak of the action potential. To simulate the recovery after the action potential, the membrane voltage is then reset to a lower value $u_r$. To avoid dealing with arbitrarily large values in simulation, researchers will often set an upper limit on the membrane potential, above which the membrane potential will be reset; for example Latham et al. (2000) reset the voltage from +20 mV to −80 mV. This voltage reset constitutes an action potential.

The theta model is very similar to the QIF model since the theta model differs from the QIF model by means of a simple coordinate transform. By scaling the voltage appropriately and letting $\Delta I$ be the change in current from the minimum current required to elicit a spike, the QIF model can be rewritten in the form

$$\dot{u} = u^2 + \Delta I.$$

Similarly, the theta model can be rewritten as

$$\dot{\theta} = 1-\cos\theta +  (1+\cos\theta) \Delta I.$$

The following proof will show that the QIF model becomes the theta model given an appropriate choice for the coordinate transform.

Define $u(t) = \tan(\theta/2)$. Recall that $d\tan(x)/dx = 1/\cos^2(x)$, so taking the derivative yields

$$\dot{u} = \frac 1 {\cos^2\left(\frac \theta 2\right)} \frac 1 2 \dot{\theta} = u^2 + \Delta I.$$

An additional substitution and rearranging in terms of $\theta$ yields

$$\dot{\theta} = 2\left[ \cos^2\left(\frac\theta2\right)\tan^2 \left(\frac\theta2\right) + \cos^2\left(\frac\theta2\right)\Delta I \right] = 2\left[ \sin^2 \left(\frac \theta 2\right) + \cos^2 \left ( \frac \theta 2\right)\Delta I \right].$$

Using the trigonometric identities $\cos^2(x/2) = \frac{1+\cos(x)}{2}$, $\sin^2(x/2) = \frac{1-\cos(x)}{2}$ and $\dot{\theta}$ as defined above, we have that

$$\dot{\theta} = 2 \left[ \frac{1-\cos\theta} 2 + \left(\frac{1+\cos\theta}{2}\right) \Delta I \right] = 1-\cos\theta + (1+\cos\theta)\Delta I.$$

Therefore, there exists a change of coordinates, namely $u(t) = \tan(\theta/2)$, which transforms the QIF model into the theta model. The reverse transformation also exists, and is attained by taking the inverse of the first transformation.

== Applications ==
=== Neuroscience ===
==== Lobster stomatogastric ganglion ====
Though the theta model was originally used to model slow cytoplasmic oscillations that modulate fast membrane oscillations in a single cell, Ermentrout and Kopell found that the theta model could be applied just as easily to systems of two electrically coupled cells such that the slow oscillations of one cell modulates the bursts of the other. Such cells serve as the central pattern generator (CPG) of the pyloric system in the lobster stomatograstic ganglion. In such a system, a slow oscillator, called the anterior burster (AB) cell, modulates the bursting cell called the pyloric dilator (PD), resulting in parabolic bursts.

==== Visual cortex ====
A group led by Boergers, used the theta model to explain why exposure to multiple simultaneous stimuli can reduce the response of the visual cortex below the normal response from a single (preferred) stimulus. Their computational results showed that this may happen due to strong stimulation of a large group of inhibitory neurons. This effect not only inhibits neighboring populations, but has the extra consequence of leaving the inhibitory neurons in disarray, thus increasing the effectiveness of inhibition.

=== Theta networks ===
Osan et al. (2002) found that in a network of theta neurons, there exist two different types of waves that propagate smoothly over the network, given a sufficiently large coupling strength. Such traveling waves are of interest because they are frequently observed in pharmacologically treated brain slices, but are hard to measure in intact animals brains. The authors used a network of theta models in favor of a network of leaky integrate-and-fire (LIF) models due to two primary advantages: first, the theta model is continuous, and second, the theta model retains information about "the delay between the crossing of the spiking threshold and the actual firing of an action potential". The LIF fails to satisfy both conditions.

=== Artificial intelligence ===
==== Steepest gradient descent learning rule ====
The theta model can also be applied to research beyond the realm of biology. McKennoch et al. (2008) derived a steepest gradient descent learning rule based on theta neuron dynamics. Their model is based on the assumption that "intrinsic neuron dynamics are sufficient to achieve consistent time coding, with no need to involve the precise shape of postsynaptic currents..." contrary to similar models like SpikeProp and Tempotron, which depend heavily on the shape of the postsynaptic potential (PSP). Not only could the multilayer theta network perform just about as well as Tempotron learning, but the rule trained the multilayer theta network to perform certain tasks neither SpikeProp nor Tempotron were capable of.

== Limitations ==
According to Kopell and Ermentrout (2004), a limitation of the theta model lies in its relative difficulty in electrically coupling two theta neurons. It is possible to create large networks of theta neurons – and much research has been done with such networks – but it may be advantageous to use Quadratic Integrate-and-Fire (QIF) neurons, which allow for electrical coupling in a "straightforward way".

== See also ==
- Biological neuron model
- Computational neuroscience
- FitzHugh–Nagumo model
- Hodgkin–Huxley model
- Neuroscience
