= Quadratic integrate and fire =

The quadratic integrate and fire (QIF) model is a biological neuron model that describes action potentials in neurons. In contrast to physiologically accurate but computationally expensive neuron models like the Hodgkin–Huxley model, the QIF model seeks only to produce action potential-like patterns by ignoring the dynamics of transmembrane currents and ion channels. Thus, the QIF model is computationally efficient and has found ubiquitous use in computational neuroscience. The QIF model is related to the Ermentrout–Kopell canonical "theta" model via a change of variables.

An idealized model of neural spiking is given by the autonomous differential equation,

$$\frac{dx}{dt} = x^2 + I$$

where $x$ represents the membrane voltage and $I\geq 0$ represents an input current. A solution to this differential equation is the function,

$$x(t) = \sqrt{I} \tan(\sqrt{I} t + c_0),$$

where $c_0$ is an arbitrary shift dependent on the initial condition $x(0)$ (specifically by the formula $c_0 = \arctan(x(0)/\sqrt{I})$). This solution "blows up" in finite time, namely at $t=n\pi/(2\sqrt{I})-c_0$ for all $n \in\mathbb{N}$, which resembles the rhythmic action potentials generated by neurons stimulated by some input current. Thus a "spike" is said to have occurred when the solution reaches positive infinity. Just after this point in time, the solution resets to negative infinity by definition.

When implementing this model in a numerical simulation, a threshold crossing value ($V_t$) and a reset value ($V_r$) is assigned, so that when the solution rises above the threshold, $x(t) \geq V_t$, the solution is immediately reset to $V_r$.

The above equation is directly related to an alternative form of the QIF model,

$$\frac{dv}{dt} = -\frac{v(1-v)}{\tau_m} + I$$,

where $\tau_m$ is the membrane time constant.
