= Exponential integrate-and-fire =

Spiking neuron model

In biology exponential integrate-and-fire models are compact and computationally efficient nonlinear spiking neuron models with one or two variables. The exponential integrate-and-fire model was first proposed as a one-dimensional model. The most prominent two-dimensional examples are the adaptive exponential integrate-and-fire model and the generalized exponential integrate-and-fire model. Exponential integrate-and-fire models are widely used in the field of computational neuroscience and spiking neural networks because of (i) a solid grounding of the neuron model in the field of experimental neuroscience, (ii) computational efficiency in simulations and hardware implementations, and (iii) mathematical transparency.

== Exponential integrate-and-fire (EIF) ==
The exponential integrate-and-fire model (EIF) is a biological neuron model, a simple modification of the classical leaky integrate-and-fire model describing how neurons produce action potentials. In the EIF, the threshold for spike initiation is replaced by a depolarizing non-linearity. The model was first introduced by Nicolas Fourcaud-Trocmé, David Hansel, Carl van Vreeswijk and Nicolas Brunel. The exponential nonlinearity was later confirmed by Badel et al. It is one of the prominent examples of a precise theoretical prediction in computational neuroscience that was later confirmed by experimental neuroscience.

In the exponential integrate-and-fire model, spike generation is exponential, following the equation:

$$\frac{dV}{dt} -  \frac{R} {\tau_m} I(t)= \frac{1} {\tau_m}[E_m-V+\Delta_T \exp \left( \frac{V - V_T} {\Delta_T} \right)]$$.

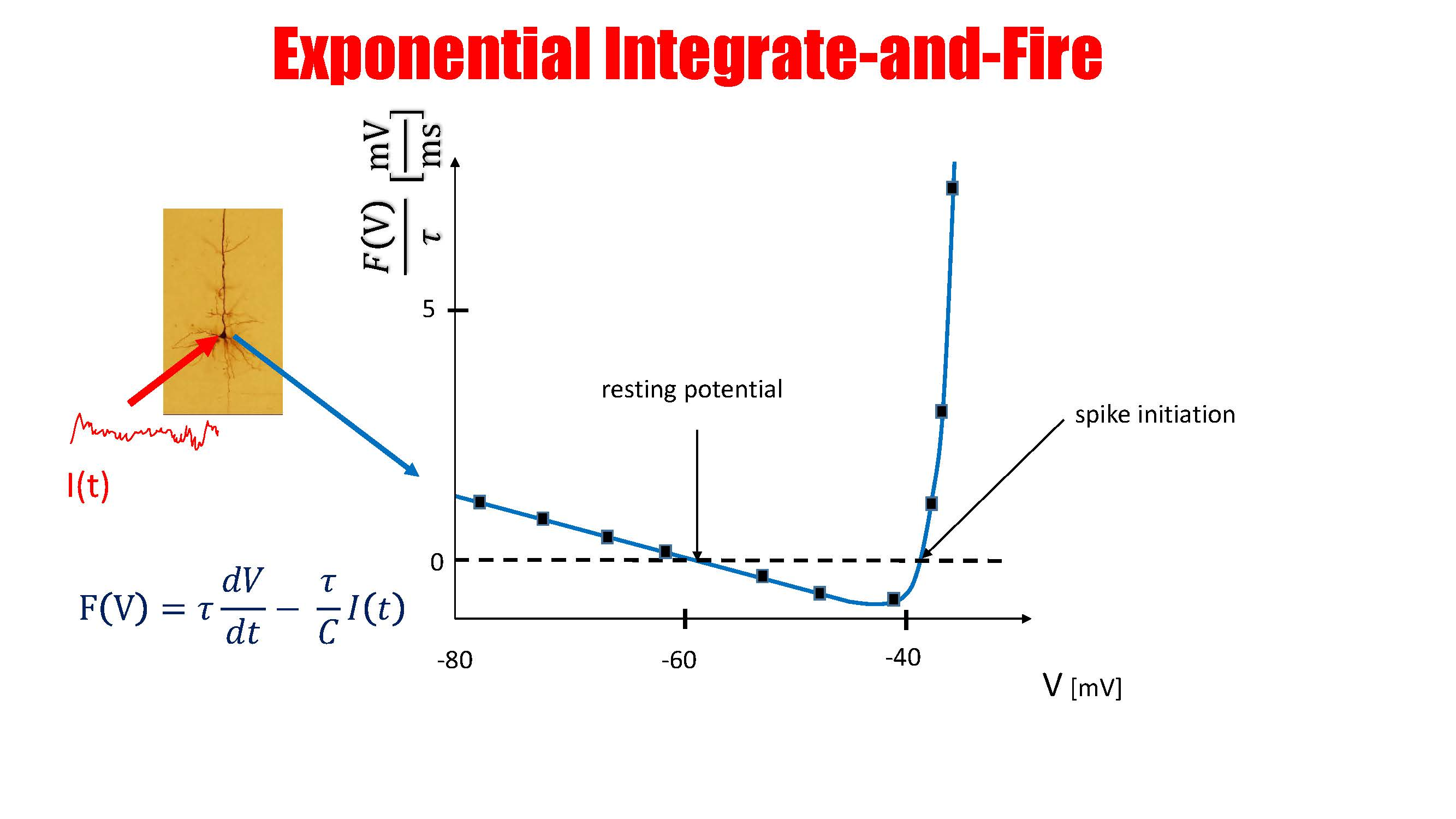
Parameters of the exponential integrate-and-fire neuron can be extracted from experimental data.

where $V$ is the membrane potential, $V_T$ is the intrinsic membrane potential threshold, $\tau_m$ is the membrane time constant, $E_m$ is the resting potential, and $\Delta_T$ is the sharpness of action potential initiation, usually around 1 mV for cortical pyramidal neurons. Once the membrane potential crosses $V_T$, it diverges to infinity in finite time. In numerical simulation the integration is stopped if the membrane potential hits an arbitrary threshold (much larger than $V_T$) at which the membrane potential is reset to a value V_{r} . The voltage reset value V_{r} is one of the important parameters of the model.

Two important remarks: (i) The right-hand side of the above equation contains a nonlinearity that can be directly extracted from experimental data. In this sense the exponential nonlinearity is not an arbitrary choice but directly supported by experimental evidence. (ii) Even though it is a nonlinear model, it is simple enough to calculate the firing rate for constant input, and the linear response to fluctuations, even in the presence of input noise.

A didactive review of the exponential integrate-and-fire model (including fit to experimental data and relation to the Hodgkin-Huxley model) can be found in Chapter 5.2 of the textbook Neuronal Dynamics.

== Adaptive exponential integrate-and-fire (AdEx) ==
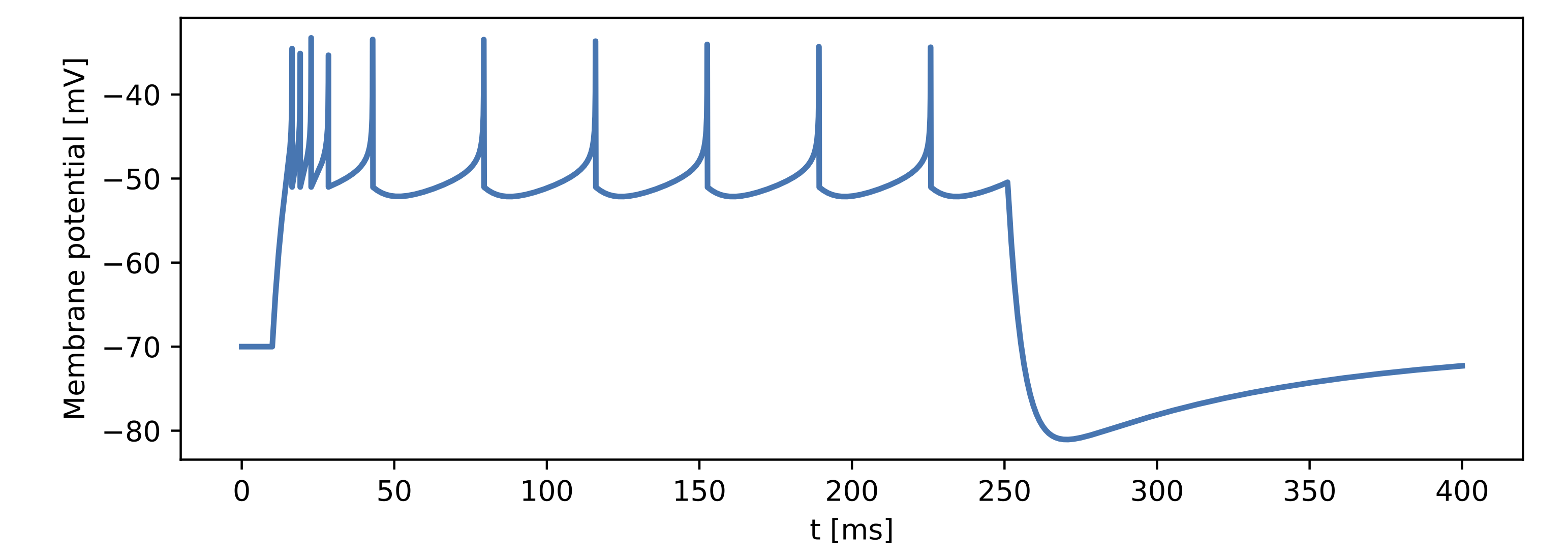
Initial bursting AdEx model

The adaptive exponential integrate-and-fire neuron (AdEx) is a two-dimensional spiking neuron model where the above exponential nonlinearity of the voltage equation is combined with an adaptation variable w

$\tau_m \frac{dV}{dt} = R I(t) + [E_m-V+\Delta_T \exp \left( \frac{V - V_T} {\Delta_T} \right)] - R w$

$\tau \frac{d w (t)}{d t} = - a [V_\mathrm{m} (t) - E_\mathrm{m} ]- w + b \tau \delta (t-t^f)$

where w denotes an adaptation current with time scale $\tau$. Important model parameters are the voltage reset value V_{r}, the intrinsic threshold $V_T$, the time constants $\tau$ and $\tau_m$ as well as the coupling parameters a and b. The adaptive exponential integrate-and-fire model inherits the experimentally derived voltage nonlinearity of the exponential integrate-and-fire model. But going beyond this model, it can also account for a variety of neuronal firing patterns in response to constant stimulation, including adaptation, bursting and initial bursting.

The adaptive exponential integrate-and-fire model is remarkable for three aspects: (i) its simplicity since it contains only two coupled variables; (ii) its foundation in experimental data since the nonlinearity of the voltage equation is extracted from experiments; and (iii) the broad spectrum of single-neuron firing patterns that can be described by an appropriate choice of AdEx model parameters. In particular, the AdEx reproduces the following firing patterns in response to a step current input: neuronal adaptation, regular bursting, initial bursting, irregular firing, regular firing.

A didactic review of the adaptive exponential integrate-and-fire model (including examples of single-neuron firing patterns) can be found in Chapter 6.1 of the textbook Neuronal Dynamics.

== Generalized exponential integrate-and-fire Model (GEM) ==
The generalized exponential integrate-and-fire model (GEM) is a two-dimensional spiking neuron model where the exponential nonlinearity of the voltage equation is combined with a subthreshold variable x

$\tau_m \frac{dV}{dt} = R I(t) + [E_m-V+\Delta_T \exp \left( \frac{V - V_T} {\Delta_T} \right)] - b \, [E_x-V] x$

$\tau_x(V) \frac{d x (t)}{d t} = x_0(V_\mathrm{m} (t))- x$

where b is a coupling parameter, $\tau_x(V)$ is a voltage-dependent time constant, and $x_0(V)$ is a saturating nonlinearity, similar to the gating variable m of the Hodgkin-Huxley model. The term $b [E_x-V] x$ in the first equation can be considered as a slow voltage-activated ion current.

The GEM is remarkable for two aspects: (i) the nonlinearity of the voltage equation is extracted from experiments; and (ii) the GEM is simple enough to enable a mathematical analysis of the stationary firing-rate and the linear response even in the presence of noisy input.

A review of the computational properties of the GEM and its relation to other spiking neuron models can be found in.
