= Parabolic bursting =

A parabolic bursting neuron has the characteristic that the frequency of spikes increase and decrease through the burst. Thus the frequency curve of a given burst takes the form of a parabola, hence the name "parabolic burst".

One such neuron that parabolically bursts is the Aplysia R-15 neuron.
