= Electrotonic potential =

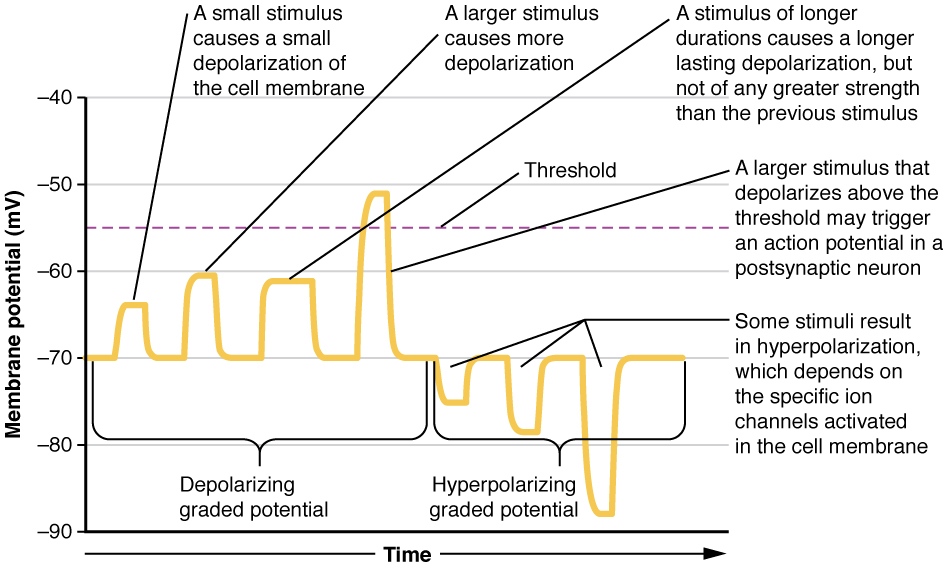
Examples of electrotonic potentials

In physiology, electrotonus refers to the passive spread of charge inside a neuron and between cardiac muscle cells or smooth muscle cells. Passive means that voltage-dependent changes in membrane conductance do not contribute. Neurons and other excitable cells produce two types of electrical potential:

- Electrotonic potential (or graded potential), a non-propagated local potential, resulting from a local change in ionic conductance (e.g. synaptic or sensory that engenders a local current). When it spreads along a stretch of membrane, it becomes exponentially smaller (decrement).
- Action potential, a propagated impulse.

Electrotonic potentials represent changes to the neuron's membrane potential that do not lead to the generation of new current by action potentials. However, all action potentials are begun by electrotonic potentials depolarizing the membrane above the threshold potential which converts the electrotonic potential into an action potential. Neurons which are small in relation to their length, such as some neurons in the brain, have only electrotonic potentials (starburst amacrine cells in the retina are believed to have these properties); longer neurons utilize electrotonic potentials to trigger the action potential.

Electrotonic potentials have an amplitude that is usually 5-20 mV and they can last from 1 ms up to several seconds long. In order to quantify the behavior of electrotonic potentials there are two constants that are commonly used: the membrane time constant τ, and the membrane length constant λ. The membrane time constant measures the amount of time for an electrotonic potential to passively fall to 1/e or 37% of its maximum. A typical value for neurons can be from 1 to 20 ms. The membrane length constant measures how far it takes for an electrotonic potential to fall to 1/e or 37% of its amplitude at the place where it began. Common values for the length constant of dendrites are from .1 to 1 mm. Electrotonic potentials are conducted faster than action potentials, but attenuate rapidly so are unsuitable for long-distance signaling. The phenomenon was first discovered by Eduard Pflüger.

== Summation ==
The electrotonic potential travels via electrotonic spread, which amounts to attraction of opposite and repulsion of like-charged ions within the cell. Electrotonic potentials can sum spatially or temporally. Spatial summation is the combination of multiple sources of ion influx (multiple channels within a dendrite, or channels within multiple dendrites), whereas temporal summation is a gradual increase in overall charge due to repeated influxes in the same location. Because the ionic charge enters in one location and dissipates to others, losing intensity as it spreads, electrotonic spread is a graded response. It is important to contrast this with the all-or-none law propagation of the action potential down the axon of the neuron.

== EPSPs ==
Electrotonic potential can either increase the membrane potential with positive charge or decrease it with negative charge. Electrotonic potentials that increase the membrane potential are called excitatory postsynaptic potentials (EPSPs). This is because they depolarize the membrane, increasing the likelihood of an action potential. As they sum together they can depolarize the membrane sufficiently to push it above the threshold potential, which will then cause an action potential to occur. EPSPs are often caused by either Na^{+} or Ca^{2+} coming into the cell.

== IPSPs ==
Electrotonic potentials which decrease the membrane potential are called inhibitory postsynaptic potentials (IPSPs). They hyperpolarize the membrane and make it harder for a cell to have an action potential. IPSPs are associated with Cl^{−} entering the cell or K^{+} leaving the cell. IPSPs can interact with EPSPs to "cancel out" their effect.

== Information Transfer ==
Because of the continuously varying nature of the electrotonic potential versus the binary response of the action potential, this creates implications for how much information can be encoded by each respective potential. Electrotonic potentials are able to transfer more information within a given time period than action potentials. This difference in information rates can be up to almost an order of magnitude greater for electrotonic potentials.

== Cable theory ==
Equivalent circuit of a neuron constructed with the assumptions of simple cable theory.

Cable theory can be useful for understanding how currents flow through the axons of a neuron. In 1855, Lord Kelvin devised this theory as a way to describe electrical properties of transatlantic telegraph cables. Almost a century later in 1946, Hodgkin and Rushton discovered cable theory could be applied to neurons as well. This theory has the neuron approximated as a cable whose radius does not change, and allows it to be represented with the partial differential equation

$$\tau \frac{\partial V}{\partial t} = \lambda^2 \frac{\partial^2 V}{\partial x^2} - V$$

where V(x, t) is the voltage across the membrane at a time t and a position x along the length of the neuron, and where λ and τ are the characteristic length and time scales on which those voltages decay in response to a stimulus. Referring to the circuit diagram on the right, these scales can be determined from the resistances and capacitances per unit length.

$$\lambda = \sqrt \frac{r_m}{r_\ell}$$
$$\tau =\ r_m c_m \,$$

From these equations one can understand how properties of a neuron affect the current passing through it. The length constant λ, increases as membrane resistance becomes larger and as the internal resistance becomes smaller, allowing current to travel farther down the neuron. The time constant τ, increases as the resistance and capacitance of the membrane increase, which causes current to travel more slowly through the neuron.

== Ribbon synapses ==
Ribbon synapses are a type of synapse often found in sensory neurons and are of a unique structure that specially equips them to respond dynamically to inputs from electrotonic potentials. They are so named for an organelle they contain, the synaptic ribbon. This organelle can hold thousands of synaptic vesicles close to the presynaptic membrane, enabling neurotransmitter release that can quickly react to a wide range of changes in the membrane potential.

== See also ==
- Plateau potentials
- Cable theory
- Bioelectrochemistry
- Voltage-gated ion channel
