= Graded potential =

Changes in membrane potential varying in size

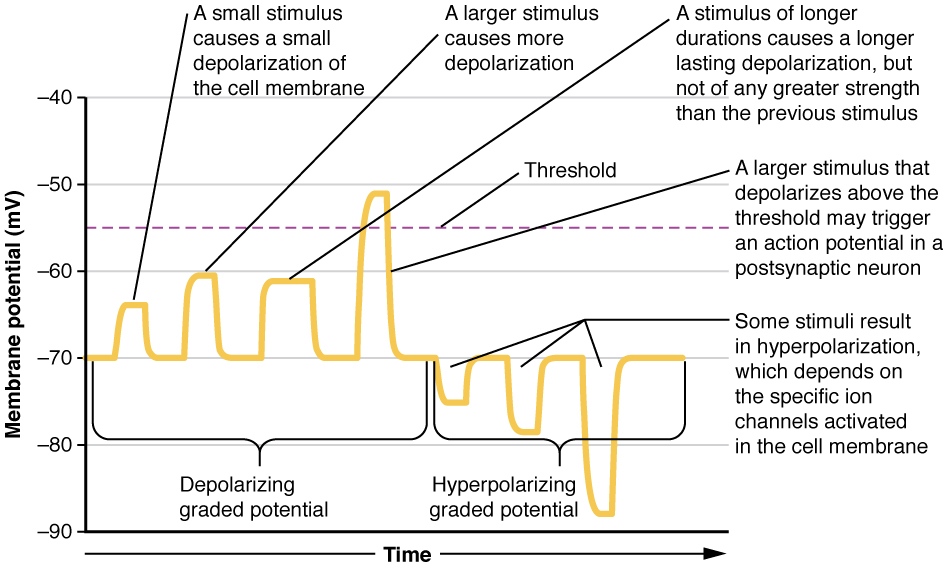
Examples of graded potentials

Graded potentials are changes in membrane potential that vary according to the size of the stimulus, as opposed to being all-or-none. They include diverse potentials such as receptor potentials, electrotonic potentials, subthreshold membrane potential oscillations, slow-wave potential, pacemaker potentials, and synaptic potentials. The magnitude of a graded potential is determined by the strength of the stimulus. They arise from the summation of the individual actions of ligand-gated ion channel proteins, and decrease over time and space. They do not typically involve voltage-gated sodium and potassium channels, but rather can be produced by neurotransmitters that are released at synapses which activate ligand-gated ion channels. They occur at the postsynaptic dendrite in response to presynaptic neuron firing and release of neurotransmitter, or may occur in skeletal, smooth, or cardiac muscle in response to nerve input. These impulses are incremental and may be excitatory or inhibitory.

== Ligand-gated ion channels ==
Graded potentials are usually produced in the dendrites of a neuron where voltage-gated channels are not present. They are localized changes in the membrane potential in response to a stimuli, like neurotransmitters binding to receptor. This binding causes a change in conformation, which activates the receptor to interact with proteins. This reaction activates the opening of ion channels resulting in movement of Na^{+}, K^{+}, Ca^{2+}, or Cl^{-} ions across the membrane producing graded potentials. Unlike action potentials, graded potentials stay in the area where the stimulation occurred and each synapse will be either excitatory or inhibitory.

== Excitatory postsynaptic potentials (EPSPs) ==
Graded potentials that make the membrane potential less negative or more positive, thus making the postsynaptic cell more likely to have an action potential, are called excitatory postsynaptic potentials (EPSPs). Depolarizing local potentials sum together, and if the voltage reaches the threshold potential, an action potential occurs in that cell.

EPSPs are caused by the influx of Na^{+} or Ca^{2+} from the extracellular space into the neuron or muscle cell. When the presynaptic neuron has an action potential, Ca^{2+} enters the axon terminal via voltage-dependent calcium channels and causes exocytosis of synaptic vesicles, causing neurotransmitter to be released. The transmitter diffuses across the synaptic cleft and activates ligand-gated ion channels that mediate the EPSP. The amplitude of the EPSP is directly proportional to the number of synaptic vesicles that were released.

If the EPSP is not large enough to trigger an action potential, the membrane subsequently repolarizes to its resting membrane potential. This shows the temporary and reversible nature of graded potentials.

== Inhibitory postsynaptic potentials (IPSPs) ==
Graded potentials that make the membrane potential more negative, and make the postsynaptic cell less likely to have an action potential, are called inhibitory post synaptic potentials (IPSPs). Hyperpolarization of membranes is caused by influx of Cl^{−} or efflux of K^{+}. As with EPSPs, the amplitude of the IPSP is directly proportional to the number of synaptic vesicles that were released.

== Summation ==
The resting membrane potential is usually around –70 mV. The typical neuron has a threshold potential ranging from –40 mV to –55 mV. Temporal summation occurs when graded potentials within the postsynaptic cell occur so rapidly that they build on each other before the previous ones fade. Spatial summation occurs when postsynaptic potentials from adjacent synapses on the cell occur simultaneously and add together. An action potential occurs when the summated EPSPs, minus the summated IPSPs, in an area of membrane reach the cell's threshold potential.
