= Pacemaker action potential =

A pacemaker action potential is the kind of action potential that provides a reference rhythm for the network. The pacemaker potential is the slow depolarization because of sodium influx, and once threshold has been reached the continued depolarization due to calcium influx. Repolarization follows, which is due to the efflux of potassium, which allows for the membrane potential to return to its negative voltage. Additionally, the longer the action potential duration the slower the heart rate will be. This means that it takes longer for the threshold to be reached because of the slow influx of sodium and the calcium and potassium channels opening at a later time. This contrasts with pacemaker potential or current which drives rhythmic modulation of firing rate.

Some pacemaker action generate rhythms for the heart beat (sino-atrial node) or the circadian rhythm in the suprachiasmatic nucleus.
