= Plateau potentials =

Type of electrical behavior seen in neurons

Plateau potentials, caused by persistent inward currents (PICs), are a type of electrical behavior seen in neurons.

== Spinal cord ==
Plateau potentials are of particular importance to spinal cord motor systems. PICs are set up by the influence of descending monoaminergic reticulospinal pathways. Metabotropic neurotransmitters, via monoaminergic input such as 5-HT and norepinephrine, modulate the activity of dendritic L-type Calcium channels that allow a sustained, positive, inward current into the cell. This leads to a lasting depolarisation. In this state, the cell fires action potentials independent of synaptic input. The PICs can be turned off via the activation of high-frequency inhibitory input at which point the cell returns to a resting state.

== Olfactory bulb ==
Periglomerular cells, inhibitory interneurons that surround and innervate olfactory glomeruli, have also been shown to exhibit plateau potentials.

== Cortex and hippocampus ==
Plateau potentials are also seen in the cortical, and hippocampal pyramidal neurons. Using iontophoretic, or two-photon glutamate uncaging experiments, it has been discovered that these plateau potentials include activities of voltage dependent calcium channels and NMDA receptors.
