= Neural accommodation =

Neural accommodation or neuronal accommodation occurs when a neuron or muscle cell is depolarised by slowly rising current (ramp depolarisation) in vitro. The Hodgkin–Huxley model also shows accommodation. Sudden depolarisation of a nerve evokes propagated action potential by activating voltage-gated fast sodium channels incorporated in the cell membrane if the depolarisation is strong enough to reach threshold. The open sodium channels allow more sodium ions to flow into the cell and resulting in further depolarisation, which will subsequently open even more sodium channels. At a certain moment this process becomes regenerative (vicious cycle) and results in the rapid ascending phase of action potential. In parallel with the depolarisation and sodium channel activation, the inactivation process of the sodium channels is also driven by depolarisation. Since the inactivation is much slower than the activation process, during the regenerative phase of action potential, inactivation is unable to prevent the "chain reaction"-like rapid increase in the membrane voltage.

During neuronal accommodation, the slowly rising depolarisation drives the activation and inactivation, as well as the potassium gates simultaneously and never evokes action potential. Failure to evoke action potential by ramp depolarisation of any strength had been a great puzzle until Hodgkin and Huxley created their physical model of action potential. Later in their life they received a Nobel Prize for their influential discoveries. Neuronal accommodation can be explained in two ways. "First, during the passage of a constant cathodal current through the membrane, the potassium conductance and the degree of inactivation will rise, both factors raising the threshold. Secondly, the steady state ionic current at all strengths of depolarization is outward, so that an applied cathodal current which rises sufficiently slowly will never evoke a regenerative response from the membrane, and excitation will not occur." (quote from Hodgkin and Huxley)

In vivo physiologic condition accommodation breaks down, that is long-duration slowly rising current excites nerve fibers at a nearly constant intensity no matter how slowly this intensity is approached.

== See also ==
- Accommodation index
- Action potential
- Anode break excitation
- Hodgkin–Huxley model
