= Neurochip =

Type of integrated circuit chip

A neurochip is an integrated circuit chip (such as a microprocessor) that is designed for interaction with neuronal cells.

== Formation ==
It is made of silicon that is doped in such a way that it contains EOSFETs (electrolyte-oxide-semiconductor field-effect transistors) that can sense the electrical activity of the neurons (action potentials) in the above-standing physiological electrolyte solution. It also contains capacitors for the electrical stimulation of the neurons. The University of Calgary, Faculty of Medicine scientists led by Pakistani-born Canadian scientist Naweed Syed who proved it is possible to cultivate a network of brain cells that reconnect on a silicon chip—or the brain on a microchip—have developed new technology that monitors brain cell activity at a resolution never achieved before.

Developed with the National Research Council Canada (NRC), the new silicon chips are also simpler to use, which will help future understanding of how brain cells work under normal conditions and permit drug discoveries for a variety of neurodegenerative diseases, such as Alzheimer's and Parkinson's.

Naweed Syed's lab cultivated brain cells on a microchip. The new technology from the lab of Naweed Syed, in collaboration with the NRC, was published online in August 2010, in the journal Biomedical Devices. It is the world's first neurochip. It is based on Syed's earlier experiments on neurochip technology dating back to 2003.

"This technical breakthrough means we can track subtle changes in brain activity at the level of ion channels and synaptic potentials, which are also the most suitable target sites for drug development in neurodegenerative diseases and neuropsychological disorders," says Syed, professor and head of the Department of Cell Biology and Anatomy, member of the Hotchkiss Brain Institute and advisor to the Vice President Research on Biomedical Engineering Initiative of the University of Calgary.

The new neurochips are also automated, meaning that anyone can learn to place individual brain cells on them. Previously it took years of training to learn how to record ion channel activity from brain cells, and it was only possible to monitor one or two cells simultaneously. Now, larger networks of cells can be placed on a chip and observed in minute detail, allowing the analysis of several brain cells networking and performing automatic, large-scale drug screening for various brain dysfunctions.

This new technology has the potential to help scientists in a variety of fields and on a variety of research projects. Gerald Zamponi, professor and head of the Department of Physiology and Pharmacology, and member of the Hotchkiss Brain Institute, says, "This technology can likely be scaled up such that it will become a novel tool for medium throughput drug screening, in addition to its usefulness for basic biomedical research".

"In previous studies, researchers developed a neurochip that could directly stimulate and record brain cell activity. Now, Orly Yadid-Pecht and Naweed Syed have successfully developed a novel lab-on-a-chip technology that, through an ultra-sensitive component built directly on the microchip, also enables direct imaging of activity in brain cells."

== Applications ==
Present applications are neuron research. Future applications (still in the experimental phase) are retinal implants or brain implants.

== See also ==
- Brain–computer interfacing
- CoDi
- Cultured neuronal networks
- Neuroprosthetics
