= Accommodation index =

The accommodation index is a statistic used in the neurosciences for describing spike train data. Many methods of experimental neuroscience, especially the electrophysiological methods, give their output in the form of measured voltages of individual neurons. Generally, the only important element of these voltage traces is the occurrence of spikes in the voltage, representing action potentials. It is often useful to be able to describe the data in terms of the spike timings; for instance, when optimizing a compartmental model towards observed behaviour, statistics such as this can be used to gauge error. Various statistics are used to do this, such as spike rate (i.e., frequency of action potentials), average interspike interval (ISI, time interval between two subsequent action potentials), and the accommodation index (AP).

It is similar to other measures of accommodation such as the local variance introduced by Shinomoto et al. in 2003. It is defined by the average of the difference in length of two consecutive interspike intervals (ISIs) normalized by the summed duration of these two ISIs. The equation for the accommodation index is

$A=\frac{1}{N-k-1}\displaystyle\sum_{i=k}^{N}\frac{(\operatorname{isi}_i-\operatorname{isi}_{i-1})}{(\operatorname{isi}_i+\operatorname{isi}_{i-1})}$

Where N is the number of APs and k determines the number of ISIs that will be disregarded in order not to take into account possible transient behavior as observed in Markram et al., 2004. A reasonable value for k is either four ISIs or one-fifth of the total number of ISIs, whichever is the smaller of the two.
