= Synaptic potential =

Potential difference across the postsynaptic membrane

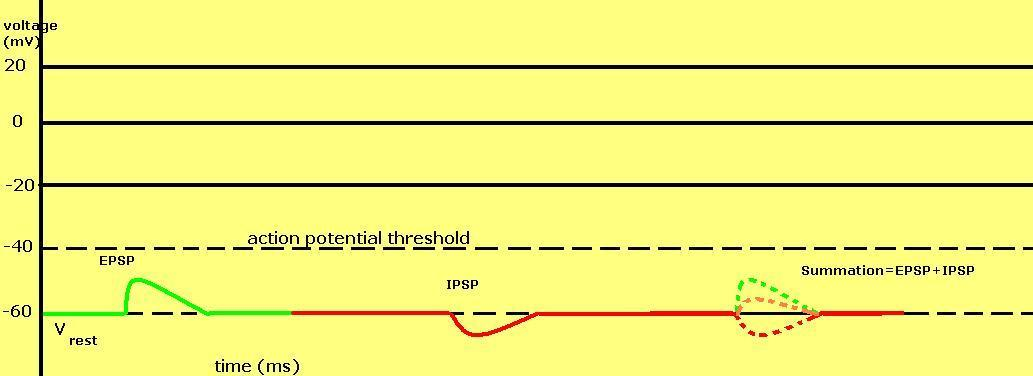
Graph showing the effects of EPSPs and IPSPs on membrane potential.

Synaptic potential refers to the potential difference across the postsynaptic membrane that results from the action of neurotransmitters at a neuronal synapse. In other words, it is the "incoming" signal that a neuron receives. There are two forms of synaptic potential: excitatory and inhibitory. The type of potential produced depends on both the postsynaptic receptor, more specifically the changes in conductance of ion channels in the post synaptic membrane, and the nature of the released neurotransmitter. Excitatory post-synaptic potentials (EPSPs) depolarize the membrane and move the potential closer to the threshold for an action potential to be generated. Inhibitory postsynaptic potentials (IPSPs) hyperpolarize the membrane and move the potential farther away from the threshold, decreasing the likelihood of an action potential occurring. The Excitatory Post Synaptic potential is most likely going to be carried out by the neurotransmitters glutamate and acetylcholine, while the Inhibitory post synaptic potential will most likely be carried out by the neurotransmitters gamma-aminobutyric acid (GABA) and glycine. In order to depolarize a neuron enough to cause an action potential, there must be enough EPSPs to both depolarize the postsynaptic membrane from its resting membrane potential to its threshold and counterbalance the concurrent IPSPs that hyperpolarize the membrane. As an example, consider a neuron with a resting membrane potential of -70 mV (millivolts) and a threshold of -50 mV. It will need to be raised 20 mV in order to pass the threshold and fire an action potential. The neuron will account for all the many incoming excitatory and inhibitory signals via summative neural integration, and if the result is an increase of 20 mV or more, an action potential will occur.

Both EPSP and IPSPs generation is contingent upon the release of neurotransmitters from a terminal button of the presynaptic neuron. The first phase of synaptic potential generation is the same for both excitatory and inhibitory potentials. As an action potential travels through the presynaptic neuron, the membrane depolarization causes voltage-gated calcium channels to open. Consequently, calcium ions flow into the cell, promoting neurotransmitter-filled vesicles to travel down to the terminal button. These vesicles fuse with the membrane, releasing the neurotransmitter into the synaptic cleft. The released neurotransmitter then binds to its receptor on the postsynaptic neuron causing an excitatory or inhibitory response. EPSPs on the postsynaptic neuron result from the main excitatory neurotransmitter, glutamate, binding to its corresponding receptors on the postsynaptic membrane. By contrast, IPSPs are induced by the binding of GABA(gamma-aminobutyric acid), or glycine.

Synaptic potentials are small and many are needed to add up to reach the threshold. This means a single EPSP/IPSP is typically not enough to trigger an action potential. The two ways that synaptic potentials can add up to potentially form an action potential are spatial summation and temporal summation. Spatial summation refers to several excitatory stimuli from different synapses converging on the same postsynaptic neuron at the same time to reach the threshold needed to reach an action potential. Temporal summation refers to successive excitatory stimuli on the same location of the postsynaptic neuron. Both types of summation are the result of adding together many excitatory potentials; the difference being whether the multiple stimuli are coming from different synapses at the same time (spatial) or at different times from the same synapse (temporal). Summation has been referred to as a "neurotransmitter induced tug-of-war" between excitatory and inhibitory stimuli. Whether the effects are combined in space or in time, they are both additive properties that require many stimuli acting together to reach the threshold. Synaptic potentials, unlike action potentials, degrade quickly as they move away from the synapse. This is the case for both excitatory and inhibitory postsynaptic potentials.

Synaptic potentials are not static. The concept of synaptic plasticity refers to the changes in synaptic potential. A synaptic potential may get stronger or weaker over time, depending on a few factors. The quantity of neurotransmitters released can play a large role in the future strength of that synapse's potential. Additionally, the receptors on the post-synaptic side also play a role, both in their numbers, composition, and physical orientation. Some of these mechanisms rely on changes in both the presynaptic and postsynaptic neurons, resulting in a prolonged modification of the synaptic potential. The strength of changes in synaptic potentials across multiple synapses must be properly regulated. Otherwise, the activity across the entire neural circuit would become uncontrollable.

In recent years, there has been an abundance of research on how to prolong the effects of a synaptic potential, and more importantly, how to enhance or reduce its amplitude. The enhancement of synaptic potential would mean that fewer would be needed to have the same or larger effect, which could have far-reaching medical uses. The research indicates that this long term potentiation or in the case of inhibitory synapses, long term depression of the synapse occurs after prolonged stimulation of two neurons at the same time. Long term potentiation is known to have a role in memory and learning, which could be useful in treating diseases like Alzheimers.

== Synaptic Potential Mechanism ==
The way that synaptic potential is created involves the theories behind potential difference and current through a conductor. When an action potential fires at the dendritic spine where the action potential is initiated from the presynaptic terminal to the post synaptic terminal. This action potential is then carried down the length of the dendrite and then is propagated down the length of the axon in order to get the presynaptic terminal to then perpetuate the process. The way that this process actually occurs is more complex than it may seem at first glance. The action potential actually occurs because of the synaptic potential across the membrane of the neuron. The potential difference between the inside of the neuron and the outside of the neuron is what will cause this process to occur once it has been initiated.

First, we must need an understanding of how the actual neuron creates this difference across its membrane. It does this first by having a strong dependence on ions both in the cell and outside of the cell. The ion potassium (K+) is the most important ion for this process of setting the membrane potential which the difference in potential across the inner and outer portion of the neuron. The second most important ion is sodium (Na+) and this ion is most prominent outside of the cell. When there is a greater concentration of sodium ions outside of the cell and a greater concentration of potassium ions inside of the cell this will cause a slight negative charge to be present within the cell. This difference across the membrane is what the neuron uses to actually do the work of sending messages from the axon hillock of the neuron all the way down to the presynaptic terminal and then on to the postsynaptic terminal because of the release of neurotransmitter into the synaptic cleft.

== See also ==
- Graded potential
