= Anode break excitation =

Electrophysiological phenomenon

Anode break excitation (ABE) is an electrophysiological phenomenon whereby a neuron fires action potentials in response to the termination of a hyperpolarizing current.

When a hyperpolarizing current is applied across a membrane, the electrical potential across the membrane falls (becomes negative than the resting potential); this drop is followed by a decrease in the threshold required for action potentials (since the threshold is directly linked to the potential across the membrane — the two rise and fall together).

ABE occurs after the hyperpolarizing current is terminated: the potential across the cell rises rapidly in the absence of the hyperpolarizing stimulus, but the action potential threshold remains at its lowered value. As a result, the potential becomes suprathreshold, which is sufficient to trigger an action potential in the cell.

== See also ==
- Action potential
- Hodgkin–Huxley model
- Neural accommodation
