= Pacemaker potential =

Electrical potential difference in the heart

In the pacemaking cells of the heart (e.g., the sinoatrial node), the pacemaker potential (also called the pacemaker current) is the slow, positive increase in voltage across the cell's membrane, that occurs between the end of one action potential and the beginning of the next. It is responsible for the self-generated rhythmic firing (automaticity) of pacemaker cells.

== Background ==
The cardiac pacemaker is the heart's natural rhythm generator. It employs pacemaker cells that generate electrical impulses, known as cardiac action potentials. These potentials cause the cardiac muscle to contract, and the rate of which these muscles contract determines the heart rate.

As with any other cells, pacemaker cells have an electrical charge on their membranes. This electrical charge is called the membrane potential. After the firing of an action potential, the pacemaking cell's membrane repolarizes (decreases in voltage) to its resting potential of -60 mV. From here, the membrane gradually depolarizes (increases in voltage) to the threshold potential of -40 mV, upon which the cell would go on to fire the next action potential. The rate of depolarization is the slope: the faster voltage increases, the steeper the slopes are in graphs. The slope determines the time taken to reach the threshold potential, and thus the timing of the next action potential.

In a healthy sinoatrial node (SAN, a complex tissue within the right atrium containing pacemaker cells that normally determine the intrinsic firing rate for the entire heart), the pacemaker potential is the main determinant of the heart rate. Because the pacemaker potential represents the non-contracting time between heart beats (diastole), it is also called the diastolic depolarization. The amount of net inward current required to move the cell membrane potential during the pacemaker phase is extremely small, in the order of few pAs, but this net flux arises from time to time changing contribution of several currents that flow with different voltage and time dependence. Evidence in support of the active presence of K^{+}, Ca^{2+}, Na^{+} channels and Na^{+}/K^{+} exchanger during the pacemaker phase have been variously reported in the literature, but several indications point to the “funny”(I_{f}) current as one of the most important. (see funny current). There is now substantial evidence that also sarcoplasmic reticulum (SR) Ca^{2+}-transients participate to the generation of the diastolic depolarization via a process involving the Na–Ca exchanger.

The rhythmic activity of some neurons like the pre-Bötzinger complex is modulated by neurotransmitters and neuropeptides, and such modulatory connectivity gives to the neurons the necessary plasticity to generating distinctive, state-dependent rhythmic patterns that depend on pacemaker potentials.

== Pacemakers ==
Pacemaker rates

The heart has several pacemakers, each which fires at its own intrinsic rate:

- SA node: 60–100 bpm
- Atrioventricular node(AVN): 40–60 bpm
- Purkinje fibres: 20–40 bpm

The potentials will normally travel in order
SA node → Atrioventricular node → Purkinje fibres

Normally, all the foci will end up firing at the SA node rate, not their intrinsic rate in a phenomenon known as overdrive-suppression. Thus, in the normal, healthy heart, only the SA node intrinsic rate is observable.

== Pathology ==
However, in pathological conditions, the intrinsic rate becomes apparent. Consider a heart attack which damages the region of the heart between the SA node and the AV node.

SA node → |block| AV node → Purkinje fibres

The other foci will not see the SA node firing; however, they will see the atrial foci. The heart will now beat at the intrinsic rate of the AV node.

== Induction ==
The firing of the pacemaker cells is induced electrically by reaching the threshold potential of the cell membrane. The threshold potential is the potential an excitable cell membrane, such as a myocyte, must reach in order to induce an action potential. This depolarization is caused by very small net inward currents of calcium ions across the cell membrane, which gives rise to the action potential.

== Bio-pacemakers ==
Bio-pacemakers are the outcome of a rapidly emerging field of research into a replacement for the electronic pacemaker. The bio-pacemaker turns quiescent myocardial cells (e.g. atrial cells) into pacemaker cells. This is achieved by making the cells express a gene which creates a pacemaker current.

== See also ==
- Pacemaker action potential
- Graded potential
