= Antidromic =

Impulse conducted in the opposite direction in an axon

An antidromic impulse in an axon refers to conduction opposite of the normal (orthodromic) direction. That is, it refers to conduction along the axon away from the axon terminal(s) and towards the soma. For most neurons, their dendrites, soma, or axons are depolarized forming an action potential that moves from the starting point of the depolarization (near the cell body) along the axons of the neuron (orthodromic). Antidromic activation is often induced experimentally by direct electrical stimulation of a presumed target structure. Antidromic activation is often used in a laboratory setting to confirm that a neuron being recorded from projects to the structure of interest.
