= Orthodromic =

Describes an impulse that runs along an axon away from the soma

An orthodromic impulse runs along an axon in its anterograde direction, away from the soma (cell body).

In the heart, orthodromic may also refer to an impulse going from the atria to the ventricles through the AV node, in contrast to some impulses in re-entry that go from the atria to the ventricles through an anomalous accessory pathway (antidromic conduction through de AV node). This is relevant in the differential diagnosis of supraventricular tachycardia, mainly AV re-entrant tachycardia.

== See also ==
- Antidromic
- Action potential
- Anterograde tracing
