= Naweed Syed =

Pakistani neuro-scientist

- Born: Attock, Pakistan
- Education: University of Karachi (BSc, MSc); University of Leeds (PhD)
- Scientific career
- Fields: Human-computer interaction
- Workplaces: University of Calgary

Naweed I. Syed is a Pakistani-born Pakistani neuro-scientist. He is the first scientist to connect brain cells to a silicon chip, creating the world's first neurochip.

Syed has travelled worldwide giving lectures and presentations about the human mind and his mini-chip. Dr. Naweed Syed is a professor at the Cumming School of Medicine, University of Calgary. He also served for 10 years as the Department Head of anatomy and cell biology, Research Director HBI at the CSM and also the Postdoctoral Program Director – Office of the Vice President (Research) from 2012 – 2016. Syed has served and chaired almost all of the university's senior committees and was Special Advisor to Vice President Research for several years.

== Research ==
Syed's research is focused at cellular and molecular mechanisms underlying brain development and plasticity. Specifically, he studies how networks of brain cells assemble during development and are modified throughout life to form the basis for learning and memory. He also investigates how various anesthetic agents affect communications between brain cells and induce cytotoxicity.

After two decades, Dr. Naweed's two-way brain-chip will be used to manage patients with epilepsy – particularly on those who do not respond to any drugs present on typical medicinal shelves.

Syed has written more than 130 highly cited research papers published in Nature (journal), Science (journal), Neuron (journal) and other prestigious journals and produced several dozen inventions and innovations.

== Honours and recognition ==
Syed is the recipient of the following recognition awards: Outstanding Scientist Award from the Asian Community in Toronto (2004); Canadian Sensation Award from South Asian Media Express Network (2012); Distinguished Achievement Award for Outstanding Contributions to Biomedical Research by Pakistan-Canada Association (PCA) (2012); Outstanding Collaboration Award, Schulich School of Engineering (2012); Canadians for Global Care Award of Recognition (2015).

Syed has received recognition both in Pakistan and abroad for his services to the field of neuroscience. He is the recipient of the Tamgha-e-Imtiaz (Medal of Excellence) by the government of Pakistan, and Canada-150 Medal by the Canadian Senate both of which he received in 2017.
