= Receptor potential =

Potential after receptor activation

A receptor potential, also known as a generator potential, a type of graded potential, is the transmembrane potential difference produced by activation of a sensory receptor.

A receptor potential is often produced by sensory transduction. It is generally a depolarizing event resulting from inward current flow. The influx of current will often bring the membrane potential of the sensory receptor towards the threshold for triggering an action potential. Receptor potential can work to trigger an action potential either within the same neuron or on an adjacent cell. Within the same neuron, a receptor potential can cause local current to flow to a region capable of generating an action potential by opening voltage-gated ion channels. A receptor potential can also cause the release of neurotransmitters from one cell that will act on another cell, generating an action potential in the second cell. The magnitude of the receptor potential determines the frequency with which action potentials are generated and is controlled by adaptation, stimulus strength, and temporal summation of successive receptor potentials. Receptor potential relies on receptor sensitivity which can adapt slowly, resulting in a slowly decaying receptor potential or rapidly, resulting in a quickly generated but shorter-lasting receptor potential.

An example of a receptor potential is in a taste bud, where taste is converted into an electrical signal sent to the brain. When stimulated, the taste bud triggers the release of neurotransmitters through exocytosis of synaptic vesicles from the presynaptic membrane. The neurotransmitter molecules diffuse across the synaptic cleft to the postsynaptic membrane of the primary sensory neuron, where they elicit an action potential.

== See also ==
- Resting potential
- Action potential
