= Orly Yadid-Pecht =

Electrical engineer and researcher

- אורלי ידיד-פכט
- Born: Israel
- Education: Technion – Israel Institute of Technology
- Known for: Image sensors
- Awards: Fellow of SPIE. IEEE. AIMBE
- Scientific career
- Workplaces: Jet Propulsion Laboratory; Ben-Gurion University of the Negev; University of Calgary

Orly Yadid-Pecht (Hebrew: אורלי ידיד-פכט) is a professor of electrical and software engineering and Alberta Innovates Technology Futures Strategic Chair of Integrated Intelligent Sensors at the University of Calgary. She develops CMOS based imaging devices for biomedical sensing. She is a Fellow of the Institute of Electrical and Electronics Engineers, SPIE and American Institute for Medical and Biological Engineering. She is an ASTech Award Winner for Technology. Yadid-Pecht holds several patents for new technologies, including sensors, health monitoring devices and drug delivery systems.

== Early life and education ==
Yadid-Pecht grew up in Israel. She studied electrical engineering at the Technion – Israel Institute of Technology. She earned her master's degree and doctorate in 1995, before moving to the United States to join the Jet Propulsion Laboratory. Here she worked on advanced wide interscene imagers for dynamic range CMOS active pixel sensors. These circuits could generate an intensity reading and simultaneously identify the location of the brightest pixel in a particular photodetector array. These sensors were created for star tracking, or monitoring laser beams in communication systems. The sensors integrate winner-take-all protocols, which would allow for the selection of the brightest pixel in each row. This would be compared with the previous stored intensity readings of other row's brightest pixels, and their data stored if they were the new brightest pixel.

== Career and research ==
Yadid-Pecht joined Ben-Gurion University of the Negev as a member of the Department of Electro-Optical Engineering. She founded the Ben-Gurion Very Large-Scale Integration (VLSI) Systems Center, where she specialised in CMOS image sensors. Researchers at the VLSI work on sensor design, reconfigurable processor architectures and high speed data channels. In 2009 Yadid-Pecht moved to Canada, where she was appointed the iCORE Professor of Integrated Sensors at the University of Calgary. She founded the I2Sense Laboratory, where she continued her research in advanced sensors. Her work involves sensors that are smart; including silicon photonics and MicroElectroMechanical systems (MEMs).

She is developing a compact-imaging sensor for lab-on-a-chip technology. Yadid-Pecht uses the sensors to image neurons and other biological tissues. She has developed wide dynamic range sensors that can capture information in real-time in environments with extreme variations of light intensity. The wide dynamic range sensors can be used in biology, nutrition and security systems. She worked with the Hotchkiss Brain Institute to monitor neurons that were being treated with various Alzheimer's disease treatments.

In 2015, Yadid-Pecht joined the advisory board of M Pharmaceutical, a Canadian biomedical innovation company. She is a trained coach, and supports students who are bringing their projects to commercialisation. She is the co-founder of Luxmux, a photonics company, and Eat Little, a nutrition start-up.

== Awards and honours ==
- 2006 Institute of Electrical and Electronics Engineers Distinguished Lecturer
- 2007 Elected Fellow of Institute of Electrical and Electronics Engineers
- 2015 Elected Fellow of SPIE
- 2018 Elected Fellow of the American Institute for Medical and Biological Engineering
- 2018 ASTech Award Winner for Technology

== Selected publications ==
Her publications include;

- Yadid-Pecht, Orly (2004). CMOS Imaging: From Photo-transduction to Image Processing. Springer-Nature. ISBN 978-1-4020-7961-0.
- Yadid-Pecht, Orly (1997). "Wide intrascene dynamic range CMOS APS using dual sampling". IEEE Transactions on Electron Devices. 44 (10): 1721–1723. Bibcode:1997ITED...44.1721Y. doi:10.1109/16.628828.
- Yadid-Pecht, Orly (1991). "A random access photodiode array for intelligent image capture". IEEE Transactions on Electron Devices. 38 (8): 1772–1780. Bibcode:1991ITED...38.1772Y. doi:10.1109/16.119013.
- Yadid-Pecht, Orly (2000). "Image sensor producing at least two integration times from each sensing pixel".
