= EOSFET =

Type of field-effect transistor

An EOSFET or electrolyte–oxide–semiconductor field-effect transistor is a FET, like a MOSFET, but with an electrolyte solution replacing the metal for the detection of neuronal activity. Many EOSFETs are integrated in a neurochip.
