= All-or-none law =

Principle in physiology

In physiology, the all-or-none law (sometimes the all-or-none principle or all-or-nothing law) is the principle that if a single nerve fibre is stimulated, it will always give a maximal response and produce an electrical impulse of a single amplitude. If the intensity or duration of the stimulus is increased, the height of the impulse will remain the same. The nerve fibre either gives a maximal response or none at all.

It was first established by the American physiologist Henry Pickering Bowditch in 1871 for the contraction of heart muscle.

An induction shock produces a contraction or fails to do so according to its strength; if it does so at all, it produces the greatest contraction that can be produced by any strength of stimulus in the condition of the muscle at the time.

This principle was later found to be present in skeletal muscle by Keith Lucas in 1909. The individual fibres of nerves also respond to stimulation according to the all-or-none principle.

== Isolation of the action potential ==
The first recorded time of isolating a single action potential was carried out by Edgar Adrian in 1925 from a set of crosscut muscle fibres. Using a thermionic triode valve amplifier with 1850 amplification, Adrian noticed that when the muscle preparation was left to hang, it produced oscillations; yet when supported, no such activity occurred. Later with the help of Yngve Zotterman, Adrian isolated and stimulated one sensory fibre. The impulses externally on the fibre were uniform: "as simple as the dots in Morse code". Stimulus strength was manipulated and the resulting frequency measured, yielding a relationship where f∝sn.

== Relationship between stimulus and response ==
As long as the stimulus reaches the threshold, the full response would be given. Larger stimulus does not result in a larger response, vice versa.

The magnitude of the action potential set up in any single nerve fibre is independent of the strength of the exciting stimulus, provided the latter is adequate. An electrical stimulus below threshold strength fails to elicit a propagated spike potential. If it is of threshold strength or over, a spike (a nervous impulse) of maximum magnitude is set up. Either the single fibre does not respond with spike production, or it responds to the utmost of its ability under the conditions at the moment. This property of the single nerve fibre is termed the all-or-none relationship. This relationship holds only for the unit of tissue; for nervous tissue the unit is the nerve cell, for skeletal muscle the unit is the individual muscle fiber and for the heart the unit is the entire auricles or the entire ventricles.

Stimuli too weak to produce a spike do, however, set up a local electrotonus, the magnitude of the electronic potential progressively increasing with the strength of the stimulus, until a spike is generated. This demonstrates the all-or-none relationship in spike production.

The above account deals with the response of a single nerve fibre. If a nerve trunk is stimulated, then as the exciting stimulus is progressively increased above a threshold, a larger number of fibres respond. The minimal effective (i.e., threshold) stimulus is adequate only for fibres of high excitability, but a stronger stimulus excites all the nerve fibres. Increasing the stimulus further does increase the response of whole nerve.

Heart muscle is excitable, i.e., it responds to external stimuli by contracting. If the external stimulus is too weak, no response is obtained; if the stimulus is adequate, the heart responds to the best of its ability. Accordingly, the auricles or ventricles behave as a single unit, so that an adequate stimulus normally produces a full contraction of either the auricles or ventricles. The force of the contraction obtained depends on the state in which the muscles fibres find themselves. In the case of muscle fibres, the individual muscle fibre does not respond at all if the stimulus is too weak. However, it responds maximally when the stimulus rises to threshold. The contraction is not increased if the stimulus strength is further raised. Stronger stimuli bring more muscle fibres into action and thus the tension of a muscle increases as the strength of the stimulus applied to it rises.

== See also ==
- Activation function
