= Inhibitory postsynaptic potential =

Electrical signal inhibiting a neuron from firing

An inhibitory postsynaptic potential (IPSP) is a kind of synaptic potential that makes a postsynaptic neuron less likely to generate an action potential. The opposite of an inhibitory postsynaptic potential is an excitatory postsynaptic potential (EPSP), which is a synaptic potential that makes a postsynaptic neuron more likely to generate an action potential. IPSPs can take place at all chemical synapses, which use the secretion of neurotransmitters to create cell-to-cell signalling. EPSPs and IPSPs compete with each other at numerous synapses of a neuron. This determines whether an action potential occurring at the presynaptic terminal produces an action potential at the postsynaptic membrane. Some common neurotransmitters involved in IPSPs are GABA and glycine.

Inhibitory presynaptic neurons release neurotransmitters that then bind to the postsynaptic receptors; this induces a change in the permeability of the postsynaptic neuronal membrane to particular ions. An electric current that changes the postsynaptic membrane potential to create a more negative postsynaptic potential is generated, i.e. the postsynaptic membrane potential becomes more negative than the resting membrane potential, and this is called hyperpolarisation. To generate an action potential, the postsynaptic membrane must depolarize—the membrane potential must reach a voltage threshold more positive than the resting membrane potential. Therefore, hyperpolarisation of the postsynaptic membrane makes it less likely for depolarisation to sufficiently occur to generate an action potential in the postsynaptic neuron.

Depolarization can also occur due to an IPSP if the reverse potential is between the resting threshold and the action potential threshold. Another way to look at inhibitory postsynaptic potentials is that they are also a chloride conductance change in the neuronal cell because it decreases the driving force. This is because, if the neurotransmitter released into the synaptic cleft causes an increase in the permeability of the postsynaptic membrane to chloride ions by binding to ligand-gated chloride ion channels and causing them to open, then chloride ions, which are in greater concentration in the synaptic cleft, diffuse into the postsynaptic neuron. As these are negatively charged ions, hyperpolarisation results, making it less likely for an action potential to be generated in the postsynaptic neuron. Microelectrodes can be used to measure postsynaptic potentials at either excitatory or inhibitory synapses.

In general, a postsynaptic potential is dependent on the type and combination of receptor channel, reverse potential of the postsynaptic potential, action potential threshold voltage, ionic permeability of the ion channel, as well as the concentrations of the ions in and out of the cell; this determines if it is excitatory or inhibitory. IPSPs always tend to keep the membrane potential more negative than the action potential threshold and can be seen as a "transient hyperpolarization".

IPSPs were first investigated in motorneurons by David P. C. Lloyd, John Eccles and Rodolfo Llinás in the 1950s and 1960s.

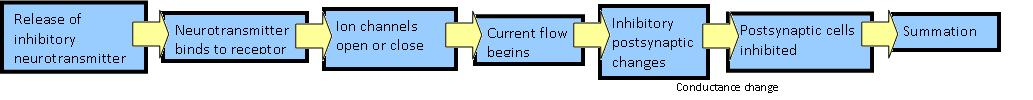
Flowchart describing how an inhibitory postsynaptic potential works from neurotransmitter release to summation

== Components ==
=== Types ===
This system IPSPs can be temporally summed with subthreshold or suprathreshold EPSPs to reduce the amplitude of the resultant postsynaptic potential. Equivalent EPSPs (positive) and IPSPs (negative) can cancel each other out when summed. The balance between EPSPs and IPSPs is very important in the integration of electrical information produced by inhibitory and excitatory synapses.

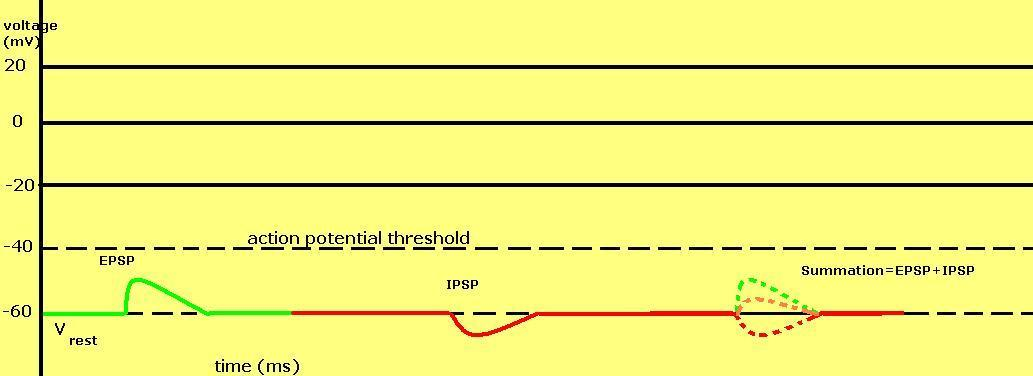
Graph displaying an EPSP, an IPSP, and the summation of an EPSP and an IPSP. When the two are summed together the potential is still below the action potential threshold.

=== Factors ===
The size of the neuron can also affect the inhibitory postsynaptic potential. Simple temporal summation of postsynaptic potentials occurs in smaller neurons, whereas in larger neurons larger numbers of synapses and ionotropic receptors as well as a longer distance from the synapse to the soma enables the prolongation of interactions between neurons.

== Inhibitory neurotransmitters ==
GABA is a very common neurotransmitter used in IPSPs in the adult mammalian brain and retina. Glycine molecules and their receptors work much in the same way in the spinal cord, brain, and retina.

== Inhibitory receptors ==
There are two types of inhibitory receptors:

=== Ionotropic receptors ===
Ionotropic receptors (also known as ligand-gated ion channels) play an important role in inhibitory postsynaptic potentials. A neurotransmitter binds to the extracellular site and opens the ion channel that is made up of a membrane-spanning domain that allows ions to flow across the membrane inside the postsynaptic cell. This type of receptor produces very fast postsynaptic actions within a couple of milliseconds of the presynaptic terminal receiving an action potential. These channels influence the amplitude and time-course of postsynaptic potentials as a whole.

Ionotropic GABA receptors (GABA_{A} receptors) are pentamers most commonly composed of three different subunits (α, β, γ), although several other subunits (δ,ε, θ, π, ρ) and conformations exist. The open channels are selectively permeable to chloride or potassium ions (depending on the type of receptor) and allow these ions to pass through the membrane. If the electrochemical potential of the ion is more negative than that of the action potential threshold then the resultant conductance change that occurs due to the binding of GABA to its receptors keeps the postsynaptic potential more negative than the threshold and decreases the probability of the postsynaptic neuron completing an action potential.

Ionotropic GABA receptors are used in binding for various drugs such as barbiturates (Phenobarbital, pentobarbital), steroids, and picrotoxin. Benzodiazepines (Valium) bind to the α and γ subunits of GABA receptors to improve GABAergic signaling. Alcohol also modulates ionotropic GABA receptors.

=== Metabotropic receptors ===
Metabotropic receptors are often G-protein-coupled receptors such as GABA_{B} receptors. These do not use ion channels in their structure; instead they consist of an extracellular domain that binds to a neurotransmitter and an intracellular domain that binds to G-protein. This begins the activation of the G-protein, which then releases itself from the receptor and interacts with ion channels and other proteins to open or close ion channels through intracellular messengers. They produce slow postsynaptic responses (from milliseconds to minutes) and can be activated in conjunction with ionotropic receptors to create both fast and slow postsynaptic potentials at one particular synapse. Metabotropic GABA receptors, heterodimers of R1 and R2 subunits, use potassium channels instead of chloride. They can also block calcium ion channels to hyperpolarize postsynaptic cells.

== Significance ==
There are many applications of inhibitory postsynaptic potentials to the real world. Drugs that affect the actions of the neurotransmitter can treat neurological and psychological disorders through different combinations of types of receptors, G-proteins, and ion channels in postsynaptic neurons.

For example, studies researching opioid receptor-mediated receptor desensitizing and trafficking in the locus coeruleus of the brain are being performed. When a high concentration of agonist is applied for an extended amount of time (fifteen minutes or more), hyperpolarization peaks and then decreases. This is significant because it is a prelude to tolerance; the more opioids one needs for pain the greater the tolerance of the patient. These studies are important because it helps us to learn more about how we deal with pain and our responses to various substances that help treat pain. By studying our tolerance to pain, we can develop more efficient medications for pain treatment.

In addition, research is being performed in the field of dopamine neurons in the ventral tegmental area, which deals with reward, and the substantia nigra, which is involved with movement and motivation. Metabotropic responses occur in dopamine neurons through the regulation of the excitability of cells. Opioids inhibit GABA release; this decreases the amount of inhibition and allows them to fire spontaneously. Morphine and opioids relate to inhibitory postsynaptic potentials because they induce disinhibition in dopamine neurons.

IPSPs can also be used to study the input-output characteristics of an inhibitory forebrain synapse used to further study learned behavior—for example in a study of song learning in birds at the University of Washington. Poisson trains of unitary IPSPs were induced at a high frequency to reproduce postsynaptic spiking in the medial portion of the dorsalateral thalamic nucleus without any extra excitatory inputs. This shows an excess of thalamic GABAergic activation. This is important because spiking timing is needed for proper sound localization in the ascending auditory pathways. Songbirds use GABAergic calyceal synaptic terminals and a calcyx-like synapse such that each cell in the dorsalateral thalamic nucleus receives at most two axon terminals from the basal ganglia to create large postsynaptic currents.

Inhibitory postsynaptic potentials are also used to study the basal ganglia of amphibians to see how motor function is modulated through its inhibitory outputs from the striatum to the tectum and tegmentum. Visually guided behaviors may be regulated through the inhibitory striato-tegmental pathway found in amphibians in a study performed at the Baylor College of Medicine and the Chinese Academy of Sciences. The basal ganglia in amphibians is very important in receiving visual, auditory, olfactory, and mechansensory inputs; the disinhibitory striato-protecto-tectal pathway is important in prey-catching behaviors of amphibians. When the ipsilateral striatum of an adult toad was electrically stimulated, inhibitory postsynaptic potentials were induced in binocular tegmental neurons, which affects the visual system of the toad.

== Studies ==
Inhibitory postsynaptic potentials can be inhibited themselves through a signaling process called "depolarized-induced suppression of inhibition (DSI)" in CA1 pyramidal cells and cerebellar Purkinje cells. In a laboratory setting step depolarizations the soma have been used to create DSIs, but it can also be achieved through synaptically induced depolarization of the dendrites. DSIs can be blocked by ionotropic receptor calcium ion channel antagonists on the somata and proximal apical dendrites of CA1 pyramidal cells. Dendritic inhibitory postsynaptic potentials can be severely reduced by DSIs through direct depolarization.

Along these lines, inhibitory postsynaptic potentials are useful in the signaling of the olfactory bulb to the olfactory cortex. EPSPs are amplified by persistent sodium ion conductance in external tufted cells. Low-voltage activated calcium ion conductance enhances even larger EPSPs. The hyperpolarization activated nonselective cation conductance decreases EPSP summation and duration and they also change inhibitory inputs into postsynaptic excitation. IPSPs come into the picture when the tufted cells membranes are depolarized and IPSPs then cause inhibition. At resting threshold IPSPs induce action potentials. GABA is responsible for much of the work of the IPSPs in the external tufted cells.

Another interesting study of inhibitory postsynaptic potentials looks at neuronal theta rhythm oscillations that can be used to represent electrophysiological phenomena and various behaviors. Theta rhythms are found in the hippocampus and GABAergic synaptic inhibition helps to modulate them. They are dependent on IPSPs and started in either CA3 by muscarinic acetylcholine receptors and within C1 by the activation of group I metabotropic glutamate receptors. When interneurons are activated by metabotropic acetylcholine receptors in the CA1 region of rat hippocampal slices, a theta pattern of IPSPs in pyramidal cells occurs independent of the input. This research also studies DSIs, showing that DSIs interrupt metabotropic acetylcholine-initiated rhythm through the release of endocannabinoids. An endocannabinoid-dependent mechanism can disrupt theta IPSPs through action potentials delivered as a burst pattern or brief train. In addition, the activation of metabotropic glutamate receptors removes any theta IPSP activity through a G-protein, calcium ion–independent pathway.

Inhibitory postsynaptic potentials have also been studied in the Purkinje cell through dendritic amplification. The study focused in on the propagation of IPSPs along dendrites and its dependency of ionotropic receptors by measuring the amplitude and time-course of the inhibitory postsynaptic potential. The results showed that both compound and unitary inhibitory postsynaptic potentials are amplified by dendritic calcium ion channels. The width of a somatic IPSP is independent of the distance between the soma and the synapse whereas the rise time increases with this distance. These IPSPs also regulate theta rhythms in pyramidal cells. On the other hand, inhibitory postsynaptic potentials are depolarizing and sometimes excitatory in immature mammalian spinal neurons because of high concentrations of intracellular chloride through ionotropic GABA or glycine chloride ion channels. These depolarizations activate voltage-dependent calcium channels. They later become hyperpolarizing as the mammal matures. To be specific, in rats, this maturation occurs during the perinatal period when brain stem projects reach the lumbar enlargement. Descending modulatory inputs are necessary for the developmental shift from depolarizing to hyperpolarizing inhibitory postsynaptic potentials. This was studied through complete spinal cord transections at birth of rats and recording IPSPs from lumbar motoneurons at the end of the first week after birth.

Glutamate, an excitatory neurotransmitter, is usually associated with excitatory postsynaptic potentials in synaptic transmission. However, a study completed at the Vollum Institute at the Oregon Health Sciences University demonstrates that glutamate can also be used to induce inhibitory postsynaptic potentials in neurons. This study explains that metabotropic glutamate receptors feature activated G proteins in dopamine neurons that induce phosphoinositide hydrolysis. The resultant products bind to inositol triphosphate (IP3) receptors through calcium ion channels. The calcium comes from stores and activate potassium conductance, which causes a pure inhibition in the dopamine cells. The changing levels of synaptically released glutamate creates an excitation through the activation of ionotropic receptors, followed by the inhibition of metabotropic glutamate receptors.

== See also ==
- Nonspiking neurons
- Shunting inhibition
