= Daniel N. Robinson =

American philosopher (1937–2018)

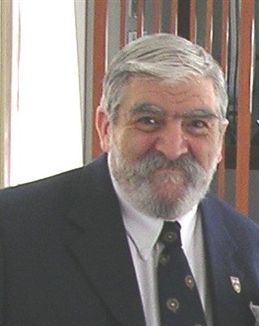
- Born: March 9, 1937; Monticello, New York, U.S.
- Died: September 17, 2018 (aged 81); Frederick, Maryland, U.S.
- Education: B.A. Colgate University; Ph.D. CUNY Graduate Center (Neuropsychology)
- Awards: Lifetime Achievement Award (American Psychological Association; Division of the History of Psychology) Distinguished Contribution Award (American Psychological Association Division of Theoretical and Philosophical Psychology); Distinguished Alumni Award (2009), CUNY Graduate Center Joseph Gittler Award (American Psychological Association
- Scientific career
- Fields: Philosophy of mind Philosophy of psychology Philosophy of law History of psychology
- Workplaces: University of Oxford; Georgetown University

Daniel Nicholas Robinson (March 9, 1937 – September 17, 2018) was an American psychologist who was a professor of psychology at Georgetown University and later in his life became a fellow of the faculty of philosophy at Oxford University.

== Career ==
Robinson published in a wide variety of subjects, including moral philosophy, the philosophy of psychology, legal philosophy, the philosophy of the mind, intellectual history, legal history, and the history of psychology. He held academic positions at Amherst College, Georgetown University, Princeton University, and Columbia University. In addition, he served as the principal consultant to PBS and the BBC for their award-winning series "The Brain" and "The Mind", and he lectured for The Great Courses' series on Philosophy and Psychology. He was on the Board of Consulting Scholars of Princeton University's James Madison Program in American Ideals and Institutions and was a Senior Fellow of BYU's Wheatley Institution. In 2011, he received the Gittler Award from the American Psychological Association for significant contributions to the philosophical foundations of Psychology.

== Primary interests ==
Robinson's interests ranged over the brain sciences, philosophy, law and intellectual history. Several of his works were illustrative of these interests. Regarded as a classic in its field, his An Intellectual History of Psychology was praised by Ernest Hilgard for its "...development of ideas as they provide alternative perspectives on the nature of mind...The reader is carried along on a genuine intellectual adventure." Robinson's enduring interest in Aristotle's thought was summarized in Aristotle's Psychology, which Deborah Modrak described as "Easy to read and informative" predicting that it would "no doubt prompt readers to reflect on the relevance of Aristotle's work to modern psychology..." (International Studies in Philosophy, Volume 23, Issue 3, 1991; pp. 142–143). In this connection, Robinson was among the small group assembled by Martin Seligman in 1999 to develop the framework for Positive Psychology.

In Wild Beasts and Idle Humours, Robinson offered a treatise on the relationship between science and jurisprudence as this developed from ancient to contemporary times. Michael Perlin describes the book as "truly unique. It synthesizes material that I do not believe has ever been considered in this context, and links up the historical past with contemporaneous values and politics. Robinson effortlessly weaves religious history, literary history, medical history, and political history, and demonstrates how the insanity defense cannot be fully understood without consideration of all these sources." Robert Kinscherff states that it "...reads like the inner workings of a fascinating and disciplined narrative mind."

Robinson's major work in moral philosophy was Praise and Blame: Moral Realism and Its Application. Reviewing the book in Review of Metaphysics, Jude P. Dougherty writes, "The richness of this work cannot be comprehended in one reading. Whether the reader agrees or not with the author, one has much to learn from the profundity of Robinson's insight into the framing of moral judgment". (Rev. Metaphys., 2003, vol. 56, 899-900.)

Central to Robinson's concerns were the conceptual and philosophical foundations of psychology and related subjects. Of Robinson's Philosophy of Psychology, William Dray wrote that "this highly readable book squarely addresses fundamental metaphysical, epistemological and methodological problems...His clear and informed treatment...offers salutary challenge to much conventional wisdom on the nature and prospects of psychological science."

Robinson was an advocate of substance dualism.

== Selected published works ==
Books

- Robinson, Daniel N. (1980). The Enlightened Machine: An Analytical Introduction to Neuropsychology. New York: Columbia University Press. ISBN 978-0-231-04955-9.
- Robinson, Daniel N. (1980). Psychology and Law. New York: Oxford University Press. ISBN 978-0-19-502726-6.
- Robinson, Daniel N. (1985). Philosophy of Psychology. New York: Columbia University Press. ISBN 978-0-231-05923-7.
- Robinson, Daniel N. (1999). Aristotle's Psychology. [S.l.]: Joe Christensen Inc. ISBN 978-0-9672066-0-8.
- Eccles, John C. and Robinson, Daniel N. (1984). The Wonder of Being Human: Our Brain and Our Mind. New York, N.Y.: Free Press. ISBN 0-02-908860-7
- Robinson, Daniel N. (1995). An Intellectual History of Psychology (3rd ed.). Madison, WI: University of Wisconsin Press. ISBN 978-0-299-14844-7.
- Robinson, Daniel N. (1998). Wild beasts & Idle Humours : the Insanity Defense from Antiquity to the Present (1st Harvard University Press pbk. ed.). Cambridge, Massachusetts: Harvard University Press. ISBN 978-0-674-95290-4.
- Robinson, Daniel N., ed. (1998) The Mind. Oxford [UK]: Oxford Univ. Press. ISBN 0-19-289308-4
- Robinson, Daniel N. (2002). Praise and Blame : Moral Realism and its Application. Princeton, N.J.: Princeton University Press. ISBN 978-0-691-05724-8.
- Robinson, Daniel N. (2008). Consciousness and Mental Life. New York: Columbia University Press. ISBN 978-0-231-14100-0.
- Robinson, Daniel N. (2012). How is nature possible? : Kant's project in the First critique. London: Continuum. ISBN 978-1-4411-4851-3.

Articles

- Robinson, Daniel N. (1966). "Visual reaction time and the human alpha rhythm: The effects of stimulus luminance, area, and duration". Journal of Experimental Psychology. 71 (1): 16–25. doi:10.1037/h0022683. PMID 5902138.
- Robinson, D. N. (7 October 1966). "Disinhibition of Visually Masked Stimuli". Science. 154 (3745): 157–158. Bibcode:1966Sci...154..157R. doi:10.1126/science.154.3745.157. PMID 5922862. S2CID 32267073.
- Robinson, D. N. (2 June 1967). "Visual Discrimination of Temporal Order". Science. 156 (3779): 1263–1264. Bibcode:1967Sci...156.1263R. doi:10.1126/science.156.3779.1263. PMID 6025553. S2CID 22555505.
- ROBINSON, DANIEL N. (1 February 1968). "Visual Disinhibition with Binocular and Interocular Presentations". Journal of the Optical Society of America. 58 (2): 254–7. Bibcode:1968JOSA...58..254R. doi:10.1364/JOSA.58.000254. PMID 5638912.
- Robinson, D. N. (9 January 1970). "Critical Flicker-Fusion of Solid and Annular Stimuli". Science. 167 (3915): 207–208. Bibcode:1970Sci...167..207R. doi:10.1126/science.167.3915.207. PMID 5409650. S2CID 27931120.
- Robinson, Daniel N. (1973). "Therapies: A clear and present danger". American Psychologist. 28 (2): 129–133. doi:10.1037/h0034244. PMID 4689042.
- Robinson, Daniel N. (1986). "What Sort of Persons Are Hemispheres? Another Look at 'Split-Brain' Man". The British Journal for the Philosophy of Science. 27 (1): 73–78. doi:10.1093/bjps/37.1.73. S2CID 229320696.
- Robinson, Daniel N. (1982). "Cerebral plurality and the unity of self". American Psychologist. 37 (8): 904–910. doi:10.1037/0003-066X.37.8.904. PMID 7137701.
- Robinson, Daniel N. (1984). "Ethics and advocacy". American Psychologist. 39 (7): 787–793. doi:10.1037/0003-066X.39.7.787.
- Robinson, Daniel N. (1 January 1991). "Antigone's Defense: A Critical Study of "Natural Law Theory: Contemporary Essays"". The Review of Metaphysics. 45 (2): 363–392. JSTOR 20129179.
- Robinson, Daniel N. (1993). "Is there a Jamesian tradition in psychology?". American Psychologist. 48 (6): 638–643. doi:10.1037/0003-066X.48.6.638.
- Robinson, D. N. (1 October 1997). "Therapy as Theory and as Civics". Theory & Psychology. 7 (5): 675–681. doi:10.1177/0959354397075005. S2CID 145802432.
- Robinson, Daniel N. (1 January 1999). "Fitness for the Rule of Law". The Review of Metaphysics. 52 (3): 539–552. JSTOR 20131189.
- Robinson Daniel."On the evident, the self-evident and the (merely) observed".American Journal of Jurisprudence, 2002, vol 47, pp. 197–210.
- Robinson, Daniel N. (2003). "Jefferson and Adams on the mind-body problem". History of Psychology. 6 (3): 227–238. doi:10.1037/1093-4510.6.3.227. PMID 14506810.
- Robinson, Daniel N. (1 January 2003). "How Religious Experience "Works": Jamesian Pragmatism and Its Warrants". The Review of Metaphysics. 56 (4): 763–778. JSTOR 20131898.
- Robinson, D. N. (8 December 2010). "Consciousness: The First Frontier". Theory & Psychology. 20 (6): 781–793. CiteSeerX 10.1.1.1029.7912. doi:10.1177/0959354310369944. S2CID 220396336.
- Robinson, D. N. (18 August 2010). "Do the people of the United States form a nation? James Wilson's theory of rights". International Journal of Constitutional Law. 8 (2): 287–297. doi:10.1093/icon/moq005.
- Robinson, Daniel N. (15 June 2012). "Determinism: Did Libet Make the Case?". Philosophy. 87 (3): 395–401. doi:10.1017/S0031819112000253. S2CID 170354988.

Video Lectures / Podcasts

- On Kant's Critique of Pure Reason

== See also ==
- American philosophy
- List of American philosophers
