= Nader Pourmand =

Professor of Biomolecular Engineering

Nader Pourmand is a Professor of Biomolecular Engineering leading the Biosensors and Bioelectrical Technology Group at the Baskin School of Engineering at the University of California Santa Cruz, Baskin School of Engineering.

He has been published in Cancer Research, PLoS ONE, ACS, and the Proceedings of the National Academy of Sciences.

Pourmand received his PhD at the Karolinska Institute, Stockholm, Sweden. While he was at Stanford, his lab developed the science underlying Ion Torrent, a benchtop next-gen sequencing system (acquired by Life Technologies, then by Thermo Fisher). He has been a cofounder of start-ups Pinpoint Science inc., BioStinger Inc. (now part of Yokogawa, Japan), MagArray Inc., and contributed to others including Nvigen, Ion Torrent, Bioprobix, and Pathogenix.

He has developed technology based on functionalized nanopipettes, which can be used to study genomics and proteomics of individual living cells at nanoscale. This nanopipette technology was described in Nature Nanotechnology as a major advance in Single cell genomics and was recognized by the NIH for the development of this technology for interrogating single living cells. This same nanopipette technology is the basis for Pinpoint Science Inc's handheld diagnostic platform for detecting microbial pathogens.

== Awards ==
- 2001: Second place prize for Technologies in the Stanford Entrepreneur's Challenge.
- 2015: NIH winner of the NIH's "Follow that Cell Challenge".
- 2017: NIH as 2017 First Prize winner of the NIH's "Follow that Cell Challenge".
