= Wilfrid Rall =

American neuroscientist

- Born: August 29, 1922; Los Angeles, California
- Died: 1 April 2018 (aged 95)
- Education: Yale University
- Known for: Rall model
- Scientific career
- Fields: Neuroscientist

Wilfrid Rall (August 29, 1922 – April 1, 2018) was a neuroscientist who spent most of his career at the National Institutes of Health. He is considered one of the founders of computational neuroscience, and was a pioneer in establishing the integrative functions of neuronal dendrites. Rall developed the use of cable theory in neuroscience, as well as passive and active compartmental modeling of the neuron.

Rall studied physics at Yale University, from which he graduated with highest honors in 1943, and where he was Chairman of the Yale Political Union's Labor Party. He was involved with the Manhattan Project at the University of Chicago during the war, and subsequently worked with K.S. Cole at Woods Hole. He then moved to the University of Otago in Dunedin to work with John Carew Eccles for his PhD, and remained there after Eccles' departure for Australia. In 1954, he spent a sabbatical year at University College London in the Biophysics Department headed by Bernard Katz, and after a final year in Dunedin (where he was Acting Head of Department) he then moved to Bethesda, Maryland and the National Institutes of Health, where he remained until his retirement in 1994.

== Scientific focus ==
Wilfrid Rall's scientific achievements concern the electrical properties of neurons, and in particular the excitability of dendrites.

Rall's work has led to a number of major conceptual breakthroughs, including the following:

1. the application of cable theory to single neurons (Rall 1957, 1959, 1960)
2. the first theoretical exploration of active dendrites (Rall and Shepherd, 1968)
3. the first theoretical exploration of active spines (Rall 1974; Miller, Rall and Rinzel, 1985)

== See also ==
- Cable theory
