= Nanopipette =

Nanopipettes are pipettes in nanometer scale, generally made from quartz capillaries with the help of laser-based pipette puller system. Glass and carbon nanopipettes are most encountered ones in literature. Carbon nanopipettes are nanopipette shaped, hollow carbon layer. The thickness or diameter of nanopipettes can be altered. Glass nanopipettes have a wide range of usage areas like electrophysiological settings, microinjection needles etc. After glass nanopipettes are fabricated and coated with carbon layer in different ways, wet-etching method is applied to get carbon nanopipettes. Wet-etching method is done to get rid of glass nanopipettes.

Nanopipettes allowed to explore protusions, dendrites and more general the properties of nanostructures, known as nanophysiology.
