= How the Self Controls Its Brain =

1994 book by John Carew Eccles

- Author: John Carew Eccles
- Language: English
- Subject: Psychology
- Publisher: Springer-Verlag
- Publication date: 1994
- Publication place: Australia
- Media type: Print
- ISBN: 3-540-56290-7
- OCLC: 29634892
- Dewey Decimal: 128/.2 20
- LC Class: B105.M55 .E33 1994

How the Self Controls Its Brain is a book by Sir John Eccles, proposing a theory of philosophical dualism, and offering a justification of how there can be mind-brain action without violating the principle of the conservation of energy. The model was developed jointly with the nuclear physicist Friedrich Beck in the period 1991–1992.

Eccles called the fundamental neural units of the cerebral cortex "dendrons", which are cylindrical bundles of neurons arranged vertically in the six outer layers or laminae of the cortex, each cylinder being about 60 micrometres in diameter. Eccles proposed that each of the 40 million dendrons is linked with a mental unit, or "psychon", representing a unitary conscious experience. In willed actions and thought, psychons act on dendrons and, for a moment, increase the probability of the firing of selected neurons through quantum tunneling effect in synaptic exocytosis, while in perception the reverse process takes place.

Previous mention of the "psychon"

The earliest prior use of the word "psychon" with a similar meaning of an "element of consciousness" is in the book "Concerning Fluctuating and Inaudible Sounds" by K. Dunlap in 1908. The most popular prior use is in Robert Heinlein's short story Gulf, wherein a character refers to the fastest speed of thought possible as "one psychon per chronon".

== See also ==
- Brain and mind
- Dualistic interactionism
