= John Eccles (neurophysiologist) =

Australian neurophysiologist (1903–1997)

Sir John Eccles AC FRS FRACP FRSNZ FAA
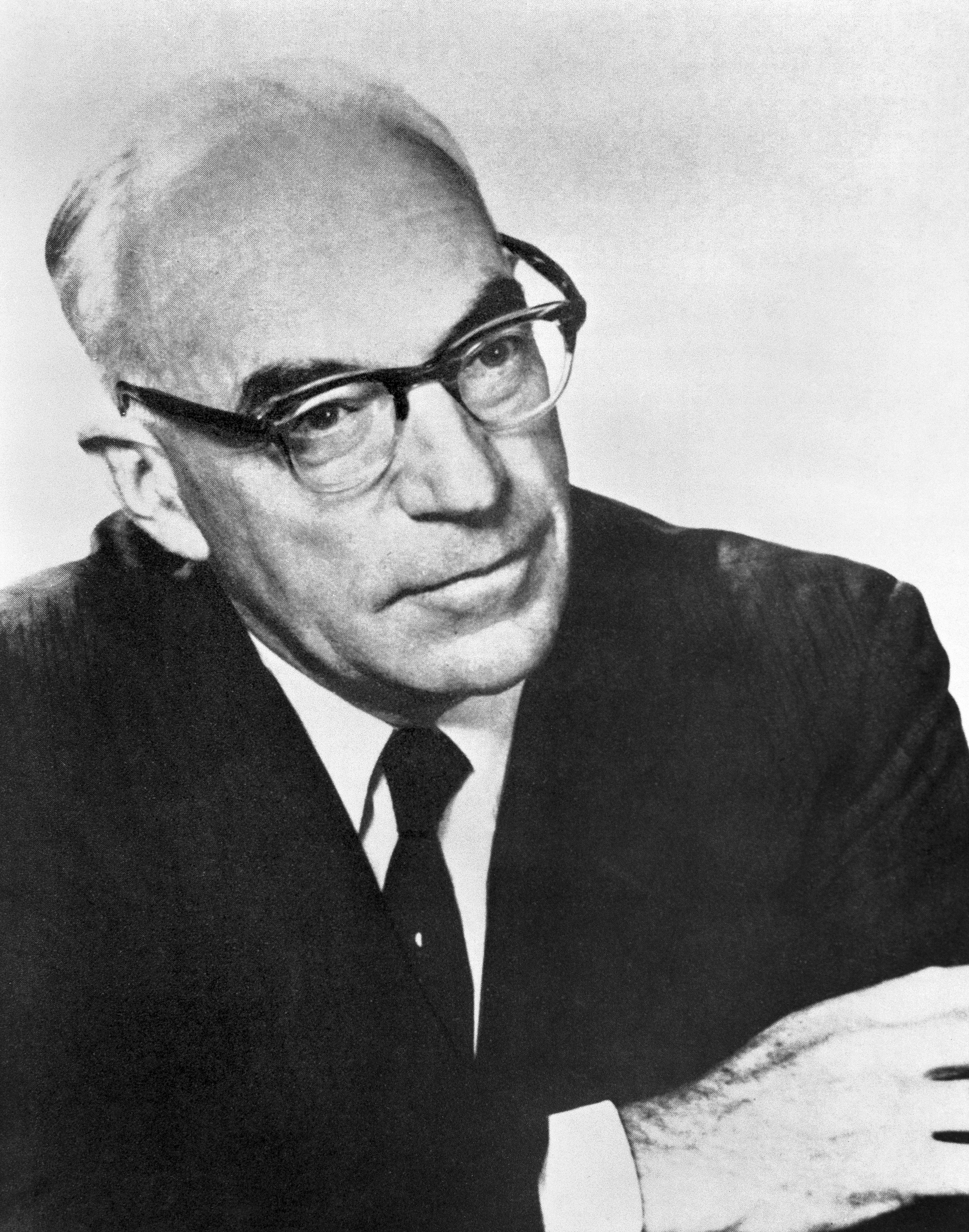
- Photographed in November 1963. Image courtesy of John Curtin School of Medical Research, Australian National University.
- Born: John Carew Eccles; 27 January 1903; Melbourne, Australia
- Died: 2 May 1997 (aged 94); Tenero-Contra, Switzerland
- Citizenship: Australia, United Kingdom, Switzerland
- Education: University of Melbourne (MD); University of Oxford (DPhil)
- Known for: Work on the synapse Interactionism
- Spouse(s): Irene Frances Miller Eccles (1928–1968; divorced), Helena T. Eccles (1968–1997; his death)
- Awards: Knight Bachelor (1958); James Cook Medal (1961); Royal Medal (1962); Nobel Prize in Physiology or Medicine (1963); Physiological Society Annual Review Prize Lecture (1972); Companion of the Order of Australia (1990)
- Scientific career
- Fields: Neuroscience; Philosophy of mind
- Workplaces: Australian National University; Northwestern University; University of Chicago
- Doctoral advisor: C. S. Sherrington
- Doctoral students: Wilfrid Rall; Stephen Kuffler; Rodolfo Llinás

Sir John Carew Eccles (27 January 1903 – 2 May 1997) was an Australian neurophysiologist and philosopher who won the 1963 Nobel Prize in Physiology or Medicine for his work on the synapse. He shared the prize with Andrew Huxley and Alan Lloyd Hodgkin.

== Life and work ==
=== Early life ===
Eccles was born in Melbourne, Australia. He grew up there with his two sisters and his parents: William and Mary Carew Eccles (both teachers, who home schooled him until he was 12). He initially attended Warrnambool High School (now Warrnambool College) (where a science wing is named in his honour), then completed his final year of schooling at Melbourne High School. Aged 17, he was awarded a senior scholarship to study medicine at the University of Melbourne. As a medical undergraduate, he was never able to find a satisfactory explanation for the interaction of mind and body; he started to think about becoming a neuroscientist. He graduated (with first class honours) in 1925, and was awarded a Rhodes Scholarship to study under Charles Scott Sherrington at Magdalen College, Oxford University, where he received his Doctor of Philosophy in 1929.

In 1937 Eccles returned to Australia, where he worked on military research during World War II. During this time, Eccles was the director of the Kanematsu Institute at Sydney Medical School, where he and Bernard Katz gave research lectures at the University of Sydney, strongly influencing the intellectual environment of the university. After the war, he became a professor at the University of Otago in New Zealand. From 1952 to 1962, he worked as a professor at the John Curtin School of Medical Research (JCSMR) of the Australian National University. From 1966 to 1968, Eccles worked at the Feinberg School of Medicine at Northwestern University in Chicago.

=== Career ===
In the early 1950s, Eccles and his colleagues performed the research that would lead to his receiving the Nobel Prize. To study synapses in the peripheral nervous system, Eccles and colleagues used the stretch reflex as a model, which is easily studied because it consists of only two neurones: a sensory neurone (the muscle spindle fibre) and the motor neurone. The sensory neurone synapses onto the motor neurone in the spinal cord. When a current is passed into the sensory neurone in the quadriceps, the motor neurone innervating the quadriceps produced a small excitatory postsynaptic potential (EPSP). When a similar current is passed through the hamstring, the opposing muscle to the quadriceps, an inhibitory postsynaptic potential (IPSP) is produced in the quadriceps motor neurone. Although a single EPSP was not enough to fire an action potential in the motor neurone, the sum of several EPSPs from multiple sensory neurones synapsing onto the motor neurone can cause the motor neurone to fire, thus contracting the quadriceps. On the other hand, IPSPs could subtract from this sum of EPSPs, preventing the motor neurone from firing.

Apart from these seminal experiments, Eccles was key to a number of important developments in neuroscience. Until around 1949, Eccles believed that synaptic transmission was primarily electrical rather than chemical. Although he was wrong in this hypothesis, his arguments led him and others to perform some of the experiments which proved chemical synaptic transmission. Bernard Katz and Eccles worked together on some of the experiments which elucidated the role of acetylcholine as a neurotransmitter in the brain.

=== Honours ===
He was appointed a Knight Bachelor in 1958 in recognition of services to physiological research.

He won the Australian of the Year Award in 1963, the same year he won the Nobel Prize.

In 1964, he became an honorary member to the American Philosophical Society, and in 1966 he moved to the United States to work as a professor at the Institute for Biomedical Research at the Feinberg School of Medicine in Chicago. Unhappy with the working conditions there, he left to become a professor at The State University of New York at Buffalo from 1968 until he retired in 1975. After retirement, he moved to Switzerland and wrote on the mind–body problem.

In 1981, Eccles became a founding member of the World Cultural Council.

In 1990 he was appointed a Companion of the Order of Australia (AC) in recognition of service to science, particularly in the field of neurophysiology. He died at the age of 94 in 1997 in Tenero-Contra, Locarno, Switzerland.

In March 2012, the Eccles Institute of Neuroscience was constructed in a new wing of the John Curtin School of Medical Research, with the assistance of a $63M grant from the Commonwealth Government. In 2021, a new $60M animal research building was opened at the University of Otago, Dunedin, New Zealand, and named the Eccles Building.

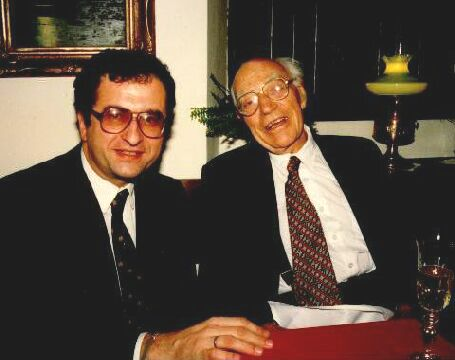
John Carew Eccles (right) with Czech psychiatrist Cyril Höschl (left) in 1993

== Philosophy ==
In The Understanding of the Brain (1973), Eccles summarises his philosophy: "Now before discussing brain function in detail I will at the beginning give an account of my philosophical position on the so-called 'brain-mind problem' so that you will be able to relate the experimental evidence to this philosophical position. I have written at length on this philosophy in my book Facing Reality. In Fig. 6-1 you will be able to see that I fully accept the recent philosophical achievements of Sir Karl Popper with his concept of three worlds. I was a dualist, now I am a trialist! Cartesian dualism has become unfashionable with many people. They embrace monism to escape the enigma of brain-mind interaction with its perplexing problems. But Sir Karl Popper and I are interactionists, and what is more, trialist interactionists! The three worlds are very easily defined. I believe that in the classification of Fig. 6-1 there is nothing left out. It takes care of everything that is in existence and in our experience. All can be classified in one or other of the categories enumerated under Worlds 1, 2 and 3.

Fig. 6-1, Three Worlds

WORLD 1	WORLD 2	WORLD 3
PHYSICAL OBJECTS AND STATES	STATES OF CONSCIOUSNESS	KNOWLEDGE IN OBJECTIVE SENSE
1. Inorganic: Matter and Energy of Cosmos	Subjective Knowledge	Records of Intellectual Efforts
2. Biology: Structure and Actions of All Living Beings; Human Brains	Experience of: Perception, Thinking, Emotions, Dispositional Intentions, Memories, Dreams, Creative Imagination	Philosophical, Theological, Scientific, Historical, Literary, Artistic, Technological
3. Artifacts: Material Substrates of human creativity, of tools, of machines, of books, of works of art, of music.		Theoretical Systems: Scientific Problems, Critical Arguments

"In Fig. 6-1, World 1 is the world of physical objects and states. It comprises the whole cosmos of matter and energy, all of biology including human brains, and all artifacts that man has made for coding information, as for example, the paper and ink of books or the material base of works of art. World 1 is the total world of the materialists. They recognise nothing else. All else is fantasy.

"World 2 is the world of states of consciousness and subjective knowledge of all kinds. The totality of our perceptions comes in this world. But there are several levels. In agreement with Polten, I tend to recognise three kinds of levels of World 2, as indicated in Fig. 6-2, but it may be more correct to think of it as a spectrum.

FIG. 6-2, World of Consciousness

Outer Sense	Inner Sense	Pure Ego
Light, Colour, Sound, Smell, Taste, Pain, Touch	Thoughts, Feelings, Memories, Dreams, Imaginings, Intentions	The Self – self soul and spirit

"The first level (outer sense) would be the ordinary perceptions provided by all our sense organs, hearing and touch and sight and smell and pain. All of these perceptions are in World 2, of course: vision with light and colour; sound with music and harmony; touch with all its qualities and vibration; the range of odours and tastes, and so on. These qualities do not exist in World 1, where correspondingly there are but electromagnetic waves, pressure waves in the atmosphere, material objects, and chemical substances.

"In addition there is a level of inner sense, which is the world of more subtle perceptions. It is the world of your emotions, of your feelings of joy and sadness and fear and anger and so on. It includes all your memory, and all your imaginings and planning into the future. In fact there is a whole range of levels which could be described at length. All the subtle experiences of the human person are in this inner sensory world. It is all private to you but you can reveal it in linguistic expression, and by gestures of all levels of subtlety.

"Finally, at the core of World 2 there is the self or pure ego, which is the basis of our unity as an experiencing being throughout our whole lifetime.

"This World 2 is our primary reality. Our conscious experiences are the basis of our knowledge of World 1, which is thus a world of secondary reality, a derivative world. Whenever I am doing a scientific experiment, for example, I have to plan it cognitively, all in my thoughts, and then consciously carry out my plan of action in the experiment. Finally I have to look at the results and evaluate them in thought. For example, I have to see the traces of the oscilloscope and their photographic records or hear the signals on the loudspeaker. The various signals from the recording equipment have to be received by my sense organs, transmitted to my brain, and so to my consciousness, then appropriately measured and compared before I can begin to think about the significance of the experimental results. We are all the time, in every action we do, incessantly playing backwards and forwards between World 1 and World 2.

"And what is World 3? As shown in Fig. 6-1 it is the whole world of culture. It is the world that was created by man and that reciprocally made man. This is my message in which I follow Popper unreservedly. The whole of language is here. All our means of communication, all our intellectual efforts coded in books, coded in the artistic and technological treasures in the museums, coded in every artefact left by man from primitive times—this is World 3 right up to the present time. It is the world of civilisation and culture. Education is the means whereby each human being is brought into relation with World 3. In this manner he becomes immersed in it throughout life, participating in the heritage of mankind and so becoming fully human. World 3 is the world that uniquely relates to man. It is the world which is completely unknown to animals. They are blind to all of World 3. I say that without any reservations. This is then the first part of my story. Now I come to consider the way in which the three worlds interact..."

Despite these words, in his late book How the Self Controls Its Brain, Eccles proposed a dualistic mechanism of mind.

== Personal life and death ==
Eccles had nine children. Eccles married Irene Miller Eccles (1904–2002) in 1928 and divorced in 1968. After his divorce in 1968, Eccles married Helena Táboríková (1925–2017); a fellow neuropsychologist and M.D. of Charles University. The two often collaborated in research and they remained married until his death. Eccles died on 2 May 1997 in his home of Contra, Switzerland. He was buried in Contra, Switzerland.

== Styles ==
- Mr John Eccles (1903–1929)
- Dr John Eccles (1929–1944)
- Prof. John Eccles (1944–1958)
- Sir John Eccles (1958–1990)
- Sir John Eccles AC (1990–1997)

== Bibliography ==
- 1932, Reflex Activity of the Spinal Cord.
- 1953, The neurophysiological basis of the mind: The principles of neurophysiology, Oxford: Clarendon.
- 1957, The Physiology of Nerve Cells.
- 1964, The Physiology of Synapses.
- 1965, The brain and the unity of conscious experience, London: Cambridge University Press.
- 1969, The Inhibitory Pathways of the Central Nervous System.
- 1970, Facing reality: Philosophical Adventures by a Brain Scientist. Berlin: Springer – via Internet Archive.
- 1973, The Understanding of the Brain.
- 1977, Popper, Karl; Eccles, John. The Self and Its Brain. Berlin and New York: Springer International – via Internet Archive.
- 1979, The human mystery, Berlin: Springer.
- 1980, The Human Psyche.
- 1984, The Wonder of Being Human – Our Brain & Our Mind, with Daniel N. Robinson, New York, Free Press.
- 1985, Mind and Brain: The Many-Faceted Problems, (Editor), New York : Paragon House.
- 1989, Evolution Of The Brain : Creation Of The Self.
- 1994, How the Self Controls Its Brain.
