= Deborah Modrak =

American philosopher

Deborah K. W. Modrak is a classicist who focuses on Aristotle and who is professor of philosophy at the University of Rochester.

== Biography ==
Modrak earned her doctorate at the University of Chicago in 1974.

== Bibliography ==
- Modrak, Deborah K. W. (1987). Aristotle: The Power of Perception. University of Chicago Press.
- Modrak, Deborah K. W. (2000). Aristotle's Theory of Language and Meaning. Cambridge University Press.
