= Monodomain model =

Model

The monodomain model is a reduction of the bidomain model of the electrical propagation in myocardial tissue. The reduction comes from assuming that the intra- and extracellular domains have equal anisotropy ratios. Although not as physiologically accurate as the bidomain model, it is still adequate in some cases, and has reduced complexity.

== Formulation ==
Being $\mathbb T$ the spatial domain, and $T$ the final time, the monodomain model can be formulated as follows
$$\frac{\lambda}{1+\lambda} \nabla \cdot \left(\mathbf\Sigma_i \nabla v \right) = \chi \left( C_m \frac{\partial v}{\partial t} + I_\text{ion} \right) \quad \quad \text{in }\mathbb T \times (0, T)
,$$

where $\mathbf\Sigma_i$ is the intracellular conductivity tensor, $v$ is the transmembrane potential, $I_\text{ion}$ is the transmembrane ionic current per unit area, $C_m$ is the membrane capacitance per unit area, $\lambda$ is the intra- to extracellular conductivity ratio, and $\chi$ is the membrane surface area per unit volume (of tissue).

=== Derivation ===
The monodomain model can be easily derived from the bidomain model. This last one can be written as
$$\begin{align}
\nabla \cdot \left(\mathbf\Sigma_i \nabla v \right) + \nabla \cdot \left(\mathbf\Sigma_i \nabla v_e \right) & = \chi \left( C_m \frac{\partial v}{\partial t} + I_\text{ion} \right) \\
\nabla \cdot \left( \mathbf\Sigma_i \nabla v \right) + \nabla \cdot \left( \left( \mathbf\Sigma_i + \mathbf\Sigma_e \right) \nabla v_e \right) & = 0
\end{align}$$

Assuming equal anisotropy ratios, i.e. $\mathbf\Sigma_e = \lambda\mathbf\Sigma_i$, the second equation can be written as
$$\nabla \cdot \left(\mathbf\Sigma_i\nabla v_e\right) = -\frac{\lambda}{1+\lambda}\nabla\cdot\left(\mathbf\Sigma_i\nabla v\right)
.$$

Then, inserting this into the first bidomain equation gives the unique equation of the monodomain model
$$\frac{1}{1+\lambda} \nabla \cdot \left(\mathbf\Sigma_i \nabla v \right) = \chi \left( C_m \frac{\partial v}{\partial t} + I_\text{ion} \right)
.$$

== Boundary conditions ==
Differently from the bidomain model, the monodomain model is usually equipped with an isolated boundary condition, which means that it is assumed that there is not current that can flow from or to the domain (usually the heart). Mathematically, this is done imposing a zero transmembrane potential flux (homogeneous Neumann boundary condition), i.e.:

$$(\mathbf \Sigma_i \nabla v)\cdot \mathbf n = 0 \quad \quad \text{on }\partial\mathbb T \times (0, T)$$

where $\mathbf n$ is the unit outward normal of the domain and $\partial \mathbb T$ is the domain boundary.

== See also ==
- Bidomain model
- Forward problem of electrocardiology
