= Nanophysiology =

Nanophysiology is a field that concerns the function of nanodomains, such as the regulation of molecular or ionic flows in cell subcompartments, such as glial protrusions, dendritic spines, dendrites, mitochondria and many more.

== Background ==
Molecular organization in nanocompartments provides the construction required to achieve elementary functions that can sustain higher physiological functions of a cell. This includes calcium homeostatis, protein turn over, plastic changes underlying cell communications. The goal of this field is to determine the function of these nanocompartments based on molecular organization, ionic flow or voltage distribution.

=== Voltage dynamics ===
How the voltage is regulated in nanodomains remains an open field. While the classical Goldman-Hodgkin-Huxley-Katz models in biophysics provides a foundation for electrophysiology and has been responsible for many advances in neuroscience, this theory remains insufficient to describe the voltage dynamics in small nano-compartments, such as synaptic terminals or cytoplasm around voltage-gated channels, because they are based on spatial and ionic homogeneity. Instead, electrodiffusion theory should be used to describe electrical current flow in these nanostructures and reveal the structure-function.
