= Odd Man Out (disambiguation) =

Odd Man Out is a 1947 British film directed by Carol Reed and starring James Mason.

Odd Man Out may also refer to:

== Film and TV ==
- Odd Man Out (British TV series), a 1977 sitcom starring John Inman
- Odd Man Out (American TV series), a 1999–2000 sitcom starring Erik von Detten
- "Odd Man Out" (Frasier), a 1997 episode of Frasier
- "Odd Man Out", a segment of the 2004–6 sports game show Stump the Schwab
- "Odd Man Out" (Prison Break), a 2005 episode of Prison Break

== Literature ==
- Odd Man Out, 1935 autobiography of Douglas Goldring
- Odd Man Out (novel), a 1945 novel by F. L. Green, basis for the 1947 film
- Odd Man Out: Readings of the Work and Reputation of Edgar Degas, a 1991 book by Carol Armstrong
- Odd Man Out: A Memoir of the Hollywood Ten, a 1996 memoir by Edward Dmytryk
- Odd Man Out: A Year on the Mound with a Minor League Misfit, a 2009 memoir by Matt McCarthy
- Odd Man Out: The Last Straw, a 2011 autobiography by Ronnie Biggs
- Odd Man Out (play), a 2017 play by David Williamson

== Music ==
- Odd Man Out, a 2006 album by Rod Clements
- Odd Man Out Tour (2005), co-headlined by Ben Folds, Ben Lee, and Rufus Wainwright

== See also ==
- Odd Man Out test, an intelligence test
