= Chris Brand =

British psychology researcher (1943–2017)

Christopher Richard Brand
- Born: 1 June 1943; Preston, United Kingdom
- Died: 28 May 2017 (aged 73)
- Citizenship: British
- Education: University of Oxford
- Known for: Inspection time as a correlate of intelligence, The g Factor: General Intelligence and Its Implications
- Scientific career
- Fields: Psychometrics
- Workplaces: formerly University of Edinburgh

Christopher Richard Brand (1 June 1943 – 28 May 2017) was a British psychological and psychometric researcher who gained media attention for his controversial statements on race and intelligence and paedophilia.

Brand was a proponent of IQ testing and the general intelligence factor, and was "a major influence in the spread of influence of inspection time as a theoretically interesting correlate of psychometric intelligence," according to Ian Deary and Pauline Smith.

== Life and career ==
Brand was born in Preston, England on 1 June 1943. He went to Queen Elizabeth's Grammar School for Boys, and was a graduate of The Queen's College, Oxford, and a 1968–1970 Fellow of Nuffield College, Oxford. He was a lecturer at University of Edinburgh, from 1970 to 1997, teaching in personality, psychopathology and philosophical problems and researching in factorial psychology. In the 1980s he served on the United Kingdom's Council for National Academic Awards. His 1996 book The g Factor garnered considerable media attention with its claim that inherited general intelligence was like psychological money. Brand wrote that general intelligence is an important factor in determining life outcomes for those with lower scores. He attributed socio-economic differences among people of African descent to differences in general intelligence.

Brand was a Fellow of the Galton Institute. From 2000 to 2004, Brand was a research consultant to the CRACK program based in Baltimore, Maryland, which pays drug-addicted mothers $200 to be sterilised. He wrote articles for American Renaissance and The Occidental Quarterly. He also wrote a blog, IQ & PC. His review of Buchanan's Playing with Fire was published in the journal Intelligence in 2011.

Brand had three children. He married his third wife in 2001. He died on 28 May 2017.

== Published positions ==
=== Race and IQ ===
Brand's discussions of race and intelligence attracted controversy because of his support for the hypothesis that average IQ differences between racial and ethnic groups are at least partly genetic in origin, a view that is now considered discredited by mainstream science.

Brand referred to himself as a "race realist" and has been described as a "scientific racist."

=== Race, IQ and women ===
Brand's controversial views generated headlines in April 1996, when he was quoted in the Independent on Sunday recommending that "low-IQ girls" be "encouraged to have sex with higher-IQ boys" rather than with their more usual low-IQ companions (which would result in genetic deterioration). "There are plenty of intelligent African men for black girls to be having sex with," he said, but added that blacks probably needed to allow polygamy.

Brand also wrote that "women are inclined to deceitful promiscuity" and that Sigmund Freud was therefore right to ascribe weaker super-egos to women than to men. His 1996 book The g Factor: General Intelligence and Its Implications led to accusations of scientific racism and sexism, and his university lectures were protested and closed by the Anti-Nazi League of Edinburgh. Brand's book was subsequently withdrawn by publisher John Wiley & Sons. It was then published free on the web by Douance.

=== Paedophilia ===
In October 1996 Brand came to the defence of Nobel laureate Daniel Carleton Gajdusek who had been charged with child sex abuse. Brand argued that sex with a consenting partner over the age of 12 was not harmful so long as both partners had an above-average IQ. Gajdusek later pled guilty and was sentenced to 12 months in prison.

The proceedings against Brand were initiated in 1996 after the dean of social sciences complained. Edinburgh University's Chaplain, a supporter of the Anti-Nazi League, had taken Brand's e-mailed reflections on pederasty to the Scottish press. Edinburgh's Student newspaper's frontpage banner headline was "FIRST IT WAS BLACKS, THEN IT WAS WOMEN, NOW IT'S KIDS".

Brand was fired from his 27-year position at Edinburgh University a year later in 1997 after hearings. The university said this was for conduct that "brought the university into disrepute".

Brand appealed and sued the university for unfair dismissal, and received £12,000 (in those days the maximum obtainable from an employment tribunal) in an out-of-court settlement. His case became a cause célèbre among advocates of academic freedom. Marek Kohn cited the Brand incident in a defence of intellectual freedom on the Internet. Others, however, including a former Brand student, considered academic freedom a privilege that carried with it an expectation of "social responsibility".

Eric Barendt (University College London), in the chapter "The Chris Brand Case" in his 2010 book Academic Freedom, said Brand should have tried harder to get on with his colleagues – who Brand replied were "Jew-leftie-commie[s]".

== Selected publications ==
- Brand, C. R. (February 1972). "Relations between emotional and social behaviour: a questionnaire study of individual differences". British Journal of Clinical Psychology. 11 (1): 10–9. doi:10.1111/j.2044-8260.1972.tb00773.x. PMID 5024653.
- Brand, C. R. (March 1981). "New IQ test?". Nature. 290 (5802): 82. Bibcode:1981Natur.290Q..82B. doi:10.1038/290082a0. PMID 7207601.
- Brand, C. R., Deary I. J. (1982). "Intelligence and 'inspection time'". In Eysenck H. J. (ed.), A Model for Intelligence, pp. 133–148. Springer-Verlag, ISBN 978-0-387-11676-1
- Brand, C. R. (1984). "Personality dimensions: an overview of modern trait psychology". In Psychology Survey 5, British Psychological Society. George Allen & Unwin, ISBN 978-0-901715-27-2
- Brand, C. R. (1989). "The "big five" dimensions of personality? Evidence from ipsative, adjectival self-attributions". Personality and Individual Differences. 10 (11): 1165–1171. doi:10.1016/0191-8869(89)90080-9.
- Brand, C. R.; Freshwater, S (1989). "Has there been a "massive" rise in IQ levels in the West? Evidence from Scottish children"". Irish Journal of Psychology. 10 (3): 388–393. doi:10.1080/03033910.1989.10557756.
- Brand, C. R.; Caryl, P. G.; Deary, I. J.; Egan, V.; Pagliari, H. C. (March 1991). "Is intelligence illusory?". The Lancet. 337 (8742): 678–9. doi:10.1016/0140-6736(91)92500-2. PMID 1672021. S2CID 40541346.
- Brand, C. R. (October 1992). "Sizing-up the brain". Nature. 359 (6398): 768. Bibcode:1992Natur.359..768B. doi:10.1038/359768a0. PMID 1436046.
- Brand, C. R. (1994). "How many dimensions of personality? The 'Big 5', the 'Gigantic 3' or the 'Comprehensive 6'?" Psychologica Belgica, 1994, vol. 34, no 4.
- Brand, C. R. (1994). Open to experience-closed to intelligence: Why the 'Big Five' are really the 'Comprehensive Six.' European Journal of Personality Volume 8, Issue 4, pp. 299–310, November 1994 doi:10.1002/per.2410080407
- Brand, C. R. (1994). Intelligence and Inspection Time: An Ontogenetic Relationship? The biology of human intelligence: proceedings of the twentieth annual symposium of the Eugenics Society London, Nafferton Books, ISBN 978-0-905484-45-7
- Brand, C. R. (October 1996). "The importance of intelligence in western societies". Journal of Biosocial Science. 28 (4): 387–404. doi:10.1017/s0021932000022495. PMID 8973000. S2CID 39696290.
- Brand, C. R. (1996). The g Factor: General Intelligence and Its Implications. John Wiley & Sons Inc., ISBN 978-0-471-96070-6
- Brand, C. R. (1997). "Hans Eysenck's personality dimensions: Their number and nature". In H. Nyborg (ed.), The Scientific Study of Human Nature: Tribute to Hans J. Eysenck at eighty, (pp. 17–35). Pergamon, ISBN 978-0-08-042787-4
- Brand, C. R., Constales, D. (1997). "Why ignore the g factor? Historical considerations". In Nyborg, H. (ed.), The Scientific Study of General Intelligence: Tribute to Arthur Jensen. Pergamon, ISBN 978-0-08-043793-4
- Kane, H. D.; Oakland, T. D.; Brand, C. R. (2006). "Differentiation at Higher Levels of Cognitive Ability: Evidence From the United States". The Journal of Genetic Psychology. 167 (3): 327–341. doi:10.3200/GNTP.167.3.327-341. PMID 17278419. S2CID 43192646.
