= Con Stough =

Australian neuroscientist

Con Stough is an Australian neuroscientist. He is a Professor of Cognitive Neuroscience and Psychology at Swinburne University of Technology, Australia, director of the Swinburne Centre for Neuropsychology and director of the newly formed National Institute of Complementary Medicine (NICM) Collaborative Centre for the study of herbal and natural medicines for neurocognition.

Stough's main interest lies in the area of intelligence, primarily the assessment of intelligence, theories of intelligence, the biological basis of intelligence and how to improve intelligence. He is a member of the editorial board of the Intelligence journal.

== Early life ==
Stough was educated at Prince Alfred College and completed his PhD in the Department of Psychology at the University of Adelaide in 1994 under the supervision of Ted Nettelbeck.

== Academic career ==
This was followed by a post-doctoral position at the University of Auckland working on the pharmacological and cognitive effects of the cholinergic agonist nicotine. At this time he also worked with Timothy Bates on evoked potential, reaction time, and inspection time measures of ability.

Over the last decade, he has worked on the neurochemical basis of intelligence, (including the distinct roles of dopamine, serotonin and acetylcholine), on cognition and emotion. He has also conducted extensive work on: the mechanisms of herbal treatments that improve intelligence, (such as Ginkgo Biloba and the Indian herb Bacopa monnieri); the assessment of emotional intelligence and evoked potentials; and the neuropsychological effects of electromagnetic emissions.

With Ben Palmer, he is the co-developer of the SUEIT (Swinburne University Emotional Intelligence Test, also referred to as GENOS EI) and helped develop the company GENOS.
