= Timothy Bates =

Psychologist and behaviour geneticist (born 1963)

- Born: 1963 (age 62–63); Auckland
- Education: University of Auckland
- Known for: Research on the genetics of dyslexia, intelligence, personality, wellbeing
- Scientific career
- Fields: Psychology, behaviour genetics
- Workplaces: University of Edinburgh
- Thesis: Psychometric & psychophysiological measures for schizotypy, creativity & psychoticism (1993)
- Doctoral advisor: Gordon Mangan

Timothy C. Bates (born 1963) is a professor of differential psychology at the University of Edinburgh. His research interests include the genetics of reading and spelling, intelligence, and personality.

== Biography ==
He is a member of the editorial board of the journal Intelligence. His PhD was completed in 1994 at the University of Auckland (New Zealand) and integrated the Eysenckian dimensional model of psychosis with the categorical model of schizotypy proposed by Paul E. Meehl, using measures of personality, creativity, evoked potentials, and smooth pursuit eye movement dysfunction. The title of his doctoral thesis was Psychometric & psychophysiological measures for schizotypy, creativity & psychoticism.

Subsequent academic publications include demonstrating the existence of two separate forms of dyslexia, underpinned by distinct genes, and, subsequently, demonstrating that the genes associated with dyslexia are also linked to normal variation in reading ability. This work lead to searches for specific genes involved in reading and language.

In positive psychology, he showed (along with Alexander Weiss and Michelle Luciano) that the genes for happiness are genes for personality, suggesting that a general factor of genetic well-being and specific genetic influences from the five factor model traits of Extraversion, Neuroticism/Stability, and Conscientiousness completely explain the heritable component of differences in happiness.

With Caroline Rae, Bates showed that creatine supports cognitive function – finding that creatine supplements in vegans substantially increased their cognitive ability and working memory by comparison with placebo. This supported a literal 'mental energy' model of intelligence, first postulated by Charles Spearman. In his work with the late Hans Eysenck and subsequently with Con Stough on the role of basic information processing speed in human intelligence, he used ERP complexity measures to argue for a modification to the Hendrickson and Hendrickson error or "string theory" (so named as pins and string were used to make the measurements of EEG output) model of ability, to include a controlling role of attention. In related work on reaction time, he introduced a novel modification to the Jensen box, again controlling the role of attention in this task, and suggesting that under these conditions, intelligence is, as Arthur Jensen proposed, related to the rate of information processing defined in Fitts Law and using Claude Shannon's information metrics.

At the University of Edinburgh he has investigated individual differences in intelligence, memory, and the genetic and environmental influences on social behaviours, such as coalition affiliation, politics, and altruism. Working with Ian Deary, Paul Irwing, and Geoff Derr, he reported evidence for substantial gender differences in intelligence in the form of much larger variance amongst males than amongst females, with more boys and men scoring in both the extreme high range, and in the extreme low range.
