= Wechsler Test of Adult Reading =

- Purpose: measure of premorbid intelligence

The Wechsler Test of Adult Reading (WTAR) is a neuropsychological assessment tool used to provide a measure of premorbid intelligence, the degree of Intellectual function prior to the onset of illness or disease.

== Test Design ==
Developed for use with English-speaking patients aged 16 to 89 years, WTAR is a “hold” test, a type of neuropsychological test that relies on abilities thought to be unaffected by cognitive decline associated with neurological damage. In the design of WTAR, the demographic prediction tables were co-normed with the widely used Wechsler Adult Intelligence Scale (WAIS) and Wechsler Memory Scale (WMS). This gives it an advantage for comparative analyses on predicted and actual general intellectual and memory function over similar reading tests such as the National Adult Reading Test (NART), which do not share normative data sets with the other widely used Wechsler assessments. Using vocabulary level as a correlate to IQ, the test relies on reading recognition’s resistance to the cognitive impacts of brain damage to estimate premorbid function. The patient is presented with irregularly spelled words and prompted to pronounce each; the irregular grapheme-to-phoneme translations (such as the “gh” in the word tough) in the prompts make it difficult pronounce without having previously learned the word. Since the patient cannot apply standard pronunciation rules to complete the task, the examiner can assess their vocabulary by their ability to pronounce the irregularly spelled words, and by extension, estimate their premorbid IQ. WTAR was published in 2001 by Pearson.

== Instructions for administration and scoring ==
The WTAR is composed of 50 irregularly spelled words and takes approximately 10 minutes to complete. The examiner begins by presenting the first word card and prompting the patient for a single pronunciation of the word. This procedure continues through all 50 word cards and is discontinued if the patient provides 12 consecutive incorrect pronunciations. Lists of acceptable pronunciations and tape recordings are provided by the publisher to account for words with multiple pronunciation variants. Each correct pronunciation is given a score of 1, with 50 as the maximum raw score. The raw score is then standardized by age and compared to the scores predicted for the patient’s demographic classification.

== Validity ==
In standardized samples, WTAR scores were shown to correlate highly with measures of verbal IQ (r = .75), verbal comprehension (r = .74), and full scale IQ (r = .73). Patients recovering from traumatic brain injury (on average measuring in severely impaired ranged on the Glasgow Coma Scale) showed high stability in WTAR scores during their recovery period while performing highly similar to demographic estimates, suggesting the test is a reliable estimate of premorbid intelligence in individuals with TBI. Presented in an inpatient neuropsychologic battery for TBI, WTAR scores have been shown to be significant predictors of 1-year outcome, suggesting score stability over time and predictive validity. WTAR performance also appears to remain stable in patients exerting suboptimal effort. Evaluation of WTAR scores across the degree of sustained TBI (mild, moderate, severe) suggests that the assessment may underestimate premorbid IQ in patients with more severe damage. In patients with Alzheimer's disease, WTAR scores declined as the degree of cognitive impairment increased in more affected individuals. Individuals with preexisting learning disorders were found to perform poorly relative to those without learning disorders. Reading-disabled individuals scored lower on WTAR than on WAIS test measures; WTAR is not recommended for use with such individuals.
