= Jensen box =

Instrument measuring choice reaction time and IQ differences

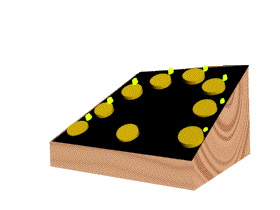
Diagram of a Jensen box, with the home button depicted in the lower center of the array. Participants are told to move their finger from the home button to one of eight additional response buttons when specific LED lights illuminate. This produces several measures of participant response time.

The Jensen box was developed by University of California, Berkeley psychologist Arthur Jensen as an experimental apparatus for measuring choice reaction time (RT) and individual differences in intelligence.

== Design and measurement ==
The standard Jensen box is approximately 12 by 20 inches in size with a sloping face. Eight buttons are arrayed in a semicircle with a 'home' key in the lower center. Above each response button is a small LED light. Following an auditory warning tone and a delay, one of the lights is illuminated and the participant releases their finger from the home button. Participants then move to initiate a button press at the illuminated location as quickly as possible.

RT is measured in two different ways: the time elapsed between the light signal and the home button release, and the time between the home button release and the target button press. These separate measures were initially conceptualized as assessing "decision time" and "movement time," respectively. However, participants can shift decision time into the movement phase by releasing the home button while the decision-making is still incomplete. Masking the stimulus light can eliminate this artifact. Several additional parameters can be extracted. The slope of RTs when 1, 2, 4, and 8 light choices are presented is used to index the rate of information processing. Variance or standard deviation in intra-individual RTs can be extracted to measure individual differences in response variability.

== Findings ==
Following Hick's law, RTs slow as a function of the number of presented choices. Button presses are fastest when only one button is shown and slowest when all eight possible response buttons are available. Simple reaction time correlates with general cognitive ability, and there is some evidence that the slope of responding on the Jensen box does as well. Ian Deary and colleagues, in a population-based cohort study of 900 individuals, demonstrated correlations between IQ and simple choice RTs between –0.3 and –0.5. The Jensen box has also been used on the Odd Man Out test.

== See also ==
- Intelligence
- Inspection time
- Mental chronometry
