= Odd Man =

Odd Man may refer to:

- Odd Man (comics), a comic hero created by Steve Ditko
- The Odd Man, the first in a trilogy of police series produced in the 1960s by Granada TV
- Odd Man (film), a 1998 short film featuring Shon Greenblatt

== See also ==
- Odd Man Out (disambiguation)
