= G factor =

g factor may refer to:

- g factor (psychometrics), a model used to describe the commonality between cognitive ability test results
- g-factor (physics), a quantity related to the magnetic moment of an electron, nucleus, or other particle
- The g Factor: The Science of Mental Ability, a book by Arthur R. Jensen about the psychometric concept
- The g Factor: General Intelligence and Its Implications, a book by Chris Brand about the psychometric concept

== See also ==
- g-force
