= Stimulus–response compatibility =

Stimulus–response (S–R) compatibility is the degree to which a person's perception of the world is compatible with the required action. S–R compatibility has been described as the "naturalness" of the association between a stimulus and its response, such as a left-oriented stimulus requiring a response from the left side of the body. A high level of S–R compatibility is typically associated with a shorter reaction time, whereas a low level of S-R compatibility tends to result in a longer reaction time, a phenomenon known as the Simon effect.

The term "stimulus-response compatibility" was first coined by Arnold Small in a presentation in 1951.

== Determinants of reaction time ==
=== Visual location ===
S–R compatibility can be seen in the variation in the amount of time taken to respond to a visual stimulus, given the similarity of the event that prompts the action, and the action itself. For example, a visual stimulus in the left of a person's field of vision is more compatible with a response involving the left hand than with a response involving the right hand.

==== Evidence ====
In 1953, Paul Fitts and C. M. Seeger ran the first experiment conclusively demonstrating that certain responses are more compatible with certain stimuli, during which subjects were alternatively instructed to press buttons on their left and right in response to lights which could appear in either the left or right corner of their field of vision. The study found that subjects took longer when the stimulus and response were incompatible. This was not in and of itself evidence for a relationship between S–R compatibility and reaction time; an alternate hypothesis posited that the delay was simply the result of the sensory information taking longer to reach neural processing centers when hemispheres are crossed. This alternate hypothesis was disproven by a follow-up trial in which Fitts and Seeger had subjects cross their arms, so that the left hand would press the right button and vice versa; the difference between reaction times of subjects in the standard and crossed-arms trials was statistically insignificant, even though the neural signal traveled a greater distance.

==== Refinements and improvements ====
The reverse scenario was tested in a 1954 experiment by Richard L. Deninger and Paul Fitts, in which it was demonstrated that subjects responded more quickly when the stimulus and response were compatible. Solid evidence that S-R compatibility impacted the response planning phase was not found until 1995, when Bernhard Hommel demonstrated that modifying stimuli in ways unrelated to S-R compatibility, such as the size of the objects on the computer screen, did not increase reaction time.

=== Auditory location ===
This phenomenon also applies to auditory stimuli. For example, hearing a tone in one ear prepares that side of the body to respond, and the reaction time will be longer if one is required to perform an action with the opposite side of the body as the side where the tone was heard, or vice versa.

==== Evidence ====
In 2000, T. E. Roswarski and Robert Proctor conducted a variation of the original Fitts and Seeger experiment involving auditory tones in each ear instead of lights. The experiment showed that the reaction time for auditory signals is also influenced by S-R compatibility.

=== Motion ===
Another determinant of S-R compatibility is the destination of a moving stimulus. For example, an object moving towards the right hand is more compatible with a right-hand response than an object moving towards the left hand, even if the object is closer to the left hand when the stimulus is perceived.

==== Evidence ====
An experiment by Claire Michaels in 1988 demonstrated the role of motion in determining S–R compatibility. In this experiment, subjects were presented with a computer display with their hands extended, and a square on the screen would appear at some random location and move towards either the right or left hand. Choice reaction time was faster when subjects responded with the same hand the square was moving towards. This experiment showed that reaction time was affected more by the destination of the square than by its current location relative to the hand by showing that reaction time was even shorter when the square started in the middle of the screen than when it was close to the destination hand.

=== Affordance ===
Also important to S–R compatibility is the type of stimulus; familiar objects tend to invite specific responses. As one example, if an object is perceived as more easily (or more typically) manipulable with one hand than the other, any response requiring use of the other hand will tend to have a long reaction time.

==== Evidence ====
In 1998, Mike Tucker and Rob Ellis conducted an experiment at the University of Plymouth which expanded the concept of S–R compatibility to higher-order cognition. In their experiment, subjects were given two buttons, one on their left and one on their right, and shown a series of pictures of familiar objects like frying pans and teacups. For each image, they were asked to press the left button if the object in the image was upright and the right button if the object was inverted. However, the objects also varied in their rotation, such that the handles faced either left or right. The experiment revealed that seeing the handle pointing in one direction primed subjects to reach with the corresponding hand, which caused discrepancies in S-R compatibility that affected reaction time; for example, a subject seeing an inverted teapot with a handle pointing left took longer to press the button on the right than a subject who saw the same teapot pointing right.

=== Expectations ===
Prior knowledge and stereotyping plays a role in S–R compatibility. If a required response is inconsistent with a person's stereotyped knowledge of a stimulus and its "typical" reactions, even if the person is aware of the necessary response in the new situation, compatibility will be low. For example, light switches in the United Kingdom are "on" when toggled down, but light switches in the United States are "on" when toggled up; a native of one country visiting the other will demonstrate low S-R compatibility when turning the lights on or off. As another example, red lights are universally associated with "stop" and green with "go", and a reversed configuration will result in a longer reaction time.

== Applications ==
S–R compatibility is an important consideration in the field of human-computer interaction, and in software engineering. Programs are easier and more intuitive to use when the input of the user and the output of the program are S–R-compatible. This would also be an important consideration in the physical design of objects...for instance, an electrical appliance with an on/off switch will be most intuitive if it is designed to conform to cultural expectations.

Additionally, principles of S–R compatibility are important considerations for psychology researchers; experiments may need to be controlled for the phenomenon. For example, behavioral neuroscience researchers should make sure that a task does not inadvertently vary along dimensions of S–R compatibility.

== See also ==
- Stroop effect
- Mental chronometry
- Hick's law
- Simon effect
- Priming
