= Hold test =

Type of intelligence test

- Purpose: for estimating premorbid intelligence in conditions as dementia, traumatic brain injury, and stroke

Hold tests are neuropsychological tests which measure abilities which are thought to be largely resistant to cognitive decline following neurological damage. As a result, these tests are widely used for estimating premorbid intelligence in conditions such as dementia, traumatic brain injury, and stroke.

== Usage ==
In neuropsychological assessment it is important to be able to accurately estimate premorbid intelligence. Accurate estimation allows the quantification of the impacts of neurological damage or decline, when compared to tests of current intelligence. The magnitude of decline is important for prognosis, rehabilitation planning and financial compensation.

== Hold tests used ==
Hold tests typically measure crystallised intelligence, that is stored knowledge and skills, such as vocabulary and pronunciation. Of course, hold tests of abilities directly affected by neurological damage are likely to underestimate intelligence. For example, using reading tests in patients with aphasia. Examples of hold tests used:

- National Adult Reading Test (NART)
- North American Adult Reading Test (NAART)
- Picture Completion subtest of Wechsler Adult Intelligence Scale
- Similarities subtest of Wechsler Adult Intelligence Scale
- Wechsler Test of Adult Reading (WTAR)
- Wide Range Achievement Test (WRAT)

== Alternate methods ==
The use of hold tests is only one of a few possible methods of quantification of premorbid function. In practice a neuropsychologist may use a combination of methods to yield the most accurate estimate of premorbid intelligence. Some of the other methods used are:

- Previous testing: While this method can be highly accurate and useful, it is rare that such information is available and even rarer still that any information beyond basic IQ testing was obtained. In the majority of cases this information is not available and other methods of estimation are required.
- Historical method: This involves a clinical interview and review of records to make a subjective estimation of premorbid Intelligence. An advantage of this method is that a clinical interview and review of records are an essential part of assessment and thus can be assessed from information that is obtained in the normal course of assessment.
- Statistical estimation: Involves the incorporation of demographic information, such as age, race education and occupational attainment into a regression equation that yields a probable intelligence complete with standard error of the estimate. One advantage of this method is the avoidance of the use current performance levels.
- Best estimate: This method determined from test scores, other observations and historical data what is the best performance of an individual. Once the highest level of functioning has been identified this is the standard against which all other performance is measured. In general a single high score should not be relied upon, unless supported from other observations. In most cases the best performance estimate will be based on a cluster of highest scores and a single. For example, a doctor who performs in tests at an average level but who has displayed superior function in prior education and occupational performance is obviously underperforming upon potential in test and past education and occupation would represent the best estimate. The advantage of the best estimate method is that a broad range of abilities are taken into account and neuropsychologists are not bound to any single battery of tests.

A review examined whether hold tests, best estimate or regression equation methods were most accurate in predicting overall IQ (full scale IQ) as determined by Wechsler Adult Intelligence Scale (WAIS-R) in a non-neurologically impaired population. It was found that different methods were more accurate depending on the IQ level of participants e.g. WRAT-3 (hold test) was most accurate for those of below average intelligence, NAART (hold test) was most accurate for those of average intelligence and the best estimate method was most accurate for above average intelligence. This provides support for the idea that no single method is superior in all cases and a combination of approaches is most appropriate in clinical practice.
