= Kmc-Subset137 =

The open-source Kmc-Subset137 Project implements the protocol described in "ERTMS/ECTS; On-line Key Management FFFIS" UNISIG SUBSET-137 ver1.0.0.

It covers the on-line distribution of cryptographic keys among the key management Centres authoritative in their respective domains. It also deals with the exchange between a key management center and its own domain KMAC entities. The open source library provides a simple C language application programming interface (API) to access and parse UNISIG SUBSET 137 messages.

For the cryptographic part of the protocol it relies on the open source GnuTLS library (or alternatively, but discouraged, on the OpenSSL library).

The library is open-source and is licensed under the GNU General Public License version 3.0.
