= Processing speed =

Processing speed may refer to

- Cognitive processing speed
- Instructions per second, a measure of a computer's processing speed
- Clock speed, also known as processor speed
