= Odd Man Out test =

Test of reaction times

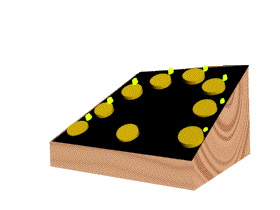
A Jensen box

The Odd-Man-Out Reaction Time test (OMO RT) is a test of reaction times that uses Arthur Jensen's testing apparatus, the Jensen box. The box is normally used for measuring choice reaction times in which the participant in the experiment is tested on their ability to recognize which of the eight lights of the Jensen box is illuminated, as quickly as possible. However, in the Odd Man Out Reaction Time test, three lights are illuminated in each trial. Two are close together and the other further apart; the individual being tested must identify this third light.

The Odd-Man-Out Reaction Time test correlates with "Intelligent Quotients (IQ) in the range of 0.30 to 0.60, a reliable and substantial effect." This correlation range is typically higher than the correlations with IQ in other reaction-time tests.

== Experiments ==
In 1986, Frearson and Hans Eysenck conducted an experiment in which they assessed participants on various intelligence tests including Jensen's Choice Reaction Time, IQ, and a “new” Odd-Man-Out Reaction Time test. In their experiment, they found that the Odd-Man-Out Reaction Time test was capable of producing "measures that were reliable and correlate well with an individual's IQ."

An interesting result from the experiment was that there was no difference in the correlation between the Odd-Man-Out Reaction Time test and IQ when displays were presented in a more difficult manner. For example, a more difficult display of the Odd Man Out Reaction Time test would mean the difference in the distance between the odd man out and the two stimuli placed closer together was less notable (x000x00x being more difficult than xx0000x0). The expectation would be that the difficulty of a display would affect the correlation between Odd-Man-Out Reaction Time test and IQ. However, this was not the case. In addition, they discovered that the position of the pattern in the layout did not play a role in the reaction time.

In another experiment by Diascro and Brody (1994), the results showed that when the complexity of the Odd Man Out Reaction Time test was increased (by comparing more distances), the correlation between the individual's performance on the test and their intelligence (measured by an IQ test) was higher. They also found that the reaction times were longer and that individuals made mistakes more often with this more complex version of the Odd-Man-Out Reaction Time test.

== Correlation with IQ tests ==
The Odd-Man-Out Reaction Time examination not only measures one's reaction time, but also one's ability to distinguish differences among the stimuli. More specifically, the odd man out task involves comparing the proportion of distances: the distance between the one light which is further away than the others, and the two lights that are closer together. Therefore, the higher correlation between the Odd Man Out Reaction Time test and IQ versus the Choice Reaction Time test and IQ could be potentially explained in that it is more complex because it tests an individual's ability to rapidly perceive differences in relationships in comparison to the Choice Reaction Time Test, which would be considered a clear discrimination task.

== Significance ==
The Odd-Man-Out Reaction Time Test is important to the study of intelligence because it enables researchers to assess the speed of an individual's perception of relationships and difference among stimuli. Furthermore, the Odd-Man-Out Test is an example of a more complex reaction time test, which has a higher correlation with IQ. The Odd-Man-Out Reaction Time test assesses two particular aspects of speed processing, "efficient sensory analysis which is measured by inspection time, and efficient decision making, which is measured by reaction time." The Odd-Man-Out Reaction Time test serves to examine an individual's speed of mental processing, which is an important "component of the intelligence measured by IQ tests."
