= Movement in learning =

Movement in learning also known as movement-based instruction, is a teaching method based on the concept that movement enhances cognitive processes and facilitates learning. This approach emphasizes integrating movement into educational settings to optimize students' engagement and academic performance. Research suggests that incorporating movement breaks as little as 10 minutes of walking, and physical activities during lessons can enhance students' ability to process and retain new information. While some studies have highlighted the positive effects of movement-based instruction, there is ongoing research exploring its effectiveness across diverse educational settings and populations.

== Benefits ==
Physical movement stimulates long-term memory and recall because it has been associated in the human brain with survival. This has been supported by brain imaging studies. This idea is confirmed by findings in studies that show that exercise can shape muscles and potentially strengthen some areas of the brain, growing brain cells and increasing alertness in the process. It is said that the harder the task is for students, the greater the cerebellar activity. Specifically, short movement breaks for the brain is said to lead to more opportunities for information processing and increased memory formation. It contributes to the overall cognitive development of the students because it sends oxygen, water, and glucose to the brain, helping it grow and improve mood and motivation. In addition, the area of the brain that processes movement is also the part that processes cognitive tasks. The link between movement and the cognitive development has been proven as early as the 1960s during Richard Held and Alan Hein's experiments that revealed the role of physical activity on the development of brain networks that are important for adaptive mental function.

Students through brain breaks to engage in physical activities can facilitate physical development. In combination with the socialization, which also contributes to the learners' socio-emotional development - movements offer a quick and convenient way to support the rapid development, especially among young learners. This can be demonstrated in the efficacy of using physical tasks to address the needs of hyperactive students because they are able to release stress and energy, allowing them to focus on their studies without causing disruption in the class. Movements also eliminate lethargy that results from sitting for long periods of time. There are recorded cases, for instance, that show marked improvement in school performance for learners who were made to do physical tasks such as walking in mid-afternoon.

== Applications in the classroom ==
Younger students can greatly benefit from engaging in various movement-based activities that reinforce their learning. Brain-based learning advocates for the incorporation of movement in educational settings. According to research from the University of Wisconsin at Stevens Point, one fundamental aspect of brain-based learning is that learning involves the entire body. This means that movement, diet, attention spans, and neurochemicals all play a role in the learning process. Another crucial principle is that complex learning is enhanced by challenges but hindered by stress. The concept of enrichment suggests that the brain has the capacity to form new connections throughout life, and that challenging and stimulating experiences, coupled with appropriate feedback, are optimal for cognitive development. Furthermore, it's noted that cognitive skills are strengthened by engaging in activities involving music and motor skills.

Supporting these ideas, both the U.S. National Institute of Health and the Mayo Clinic advocate for exercise and movement as effective means to reduce stress levels. Given that elementary-aged children can effectively absorb only 15 to 20 minutes of material at a time, incorporating regular brain breaks into lessons becomes essential. Implementing brain breaks into the classroom routine offers multiple benefits for both students and teachers alike. These breaks not only provide opportunities for learning but also allow students to return to tasks feeling refreshed and energized.

Another method in movement-based instruction is the use of science choreography, which is a technique that uses movement to teach science. A team of scientists, educators, dancers, and choreographers worked together to develop movement-based activities inspired by dance to teach science concepts.

Chart: Sample movements and classroom applications

Movement(s) Category	Examples	Classroom Application
Exercise or play	Running, chasing, recess activities	Creating dance routines, run on the spot, perform knowledge of a process
Contact or sports	Soccer, football, wrestling	PE classes
Introverted play	Puzzles, Lego, crosswords	Building using objects to show creativity or to assess knowledge of a concept learnt. Group puzzles (educator made to make connections or just general for team-building) Vocabulary crosswords
Outdoor learning	Playing in the garden, digging, physical, social, and cognition development	Relate to science lessons, hands-on experiments, observing and making real life connections
Stand & stretch	Tai chi, yoga, passive or active stretching	Simon says, goal setting on the move, gallery walks, full body stretches and stand up to get a paper or supplies before assignment
Group/team competitive games/activities	Relays	Relay teams for math questions on the board
Constructive play	Building with blocks	Model building of how something works
Exploratory	Hide and seeks, scavenger hunts, make-believe	Hide and seek with answers. Hide clues throughout the classroom that lead to answers
Functional	Purposeful play	Ball tossing for reviewing or building vocabulary, story-building and movements that incorporate opposite or cross-lateral movements (tap your head and rub your stomach)
Group non-competitive	Team building, social, collaborative thinking, dance, drama	Collaborative drawing and stories, role playing and group presentations
Individual competitive	Marbles, track and field, hopscotch	Spelling words on the board, math fact around-the-world game
Adventure or confidence	Walking excursions, ropes course	Field trips, walks inside the school, walks outside the school exploring environments

== Movement in Learning Environments Research ==
A study by Vujičić, Peić, and Petrić compared movement-based integrated learning in early childhood education across two groups attending city kindergartens (an experimental group emphasizing movement and a control group with standard integrated learning practices). In the experimental group, the gym was organized to enable children’s exploration, with the teacher taking on an indirect facilitator role, whereas the control group followed traditional teaching methods. Results of the research showed that children in the movement-based group exhibited higher levels of engagement, motor skill development, and enjoyment in learning. This research emphasized the importance of considering physical environments in early education for enhancing learning experiences.

=== Additional benefits for special-needs learners ===
Movements, such as those involved in playing active games, are thought to activate the brain across a wide variety of areas in ways that may be beneficial to students with disabilities. A study by Reynolds and colleagues (2003) found that children with dyslexia were assisted by a movement program. Those in the intervention group showed significantly greater improvement in dexterity, reading, verbal fluency, and semantic fluency than those in the control group. The exercising group also made substantial gains on national standardized tests of reading, writing, and comprehension in comparison with students in the previous year.

== See also ==
- Psychomotor learning
