= Elementary cognitive task =

Simplest tasks used in intelligence testing

An elementary cognitive task (ECT) is any of a range of basic tasks which require only a small number of mental processes and which have easily specified correct outcomes.

The term was proposed by John Bissell Carroll in 1980, who posited that all test performance could be analyzed and broken down to building blocks called ECTs. Test batteries such as Microtox were developed based on this theory and have shown utility in the evaluation of test subjects under the influence of carbon monoxide or alcohol.

== See also ==
- Mental chronometry
- Inspection time
