= Lothian birth-cohort studies =

The Lothian birth-cohort studies are two ongoing cohort studies which primarily involve research into how childhood intelligence relates to intelligence and health in old age. The Lothian Birth Cohort studies of 1921 and 1936 have, respectively, followed up Lothian-based participants in the Scottish Mental Surveys of 1932 and 1947 in old age. Scottish Mental Survey data has provided a measure of the intelligence of Lothian Birth Cohort participants at age 11, which has enabled the investigation of how childhood intelligence relates to cognition, mental health and physical health in old age.

Major cognitive ageing findings of the studies have concerned the stability of intelligence from childhood to old age, the influence of genetics on cognitive function and decline, and the role of the brain's white matter integrity in successful cognitive ageing. The studies have also been at the vanguard of the field of cognitive epidemiology, which explores how intelligence relates to physical and mental health outcomes. The Lothian Birth Cohort studies are led by Ian Deary, the director of the Centre for Cognitive Ageing and Cognitive Epidemiology at the University of Edinburgh.

== Background ==
The Lothian Birth Cohort (LBC) studies of 1921 (LBC1921) and 1936 (LBC1936) are follow-up studies of, respectively, the Scottish Mental Surveys (SMSs) of 1932 (SMS1932) and 1947 (SMS1947). The Scottish Mental Surveys, which were undertaken by the Scottish Council for Research in Education (SCRE), are the only attempts to date of any country to measure the intelligence of a complete year-of-birth in its population. By following up SMS participants in old age, the LBC studies have been able to effectively investigate long-term cognitive ageing and cognitive epidemiology due to the availability of a measure of participants' childhood intelligence.

The Moray House Test No. 12, designed by Godfrey Thomson, was used in both Scottish Mental Surveys. It is a valid intelligence test that consists of 75 items of a variety of types including: following directions; word classification; analogies; practical items; reasoning; arithmetic; and spatial items.

=== Scottish Mental Surveys of 1932 and 1947 ===
The SMS1932 was funded by the Carnegie Corporation as part of the International Examination Inquiry. It aimed to find out how many children in Scotland were "mentally deficient" and gather information on the entire distribution of intelligence in Scottish pupils. It was conducted on 1 June 1932, and tested the intelligence of almost all of Scotland's 1921-born population, 87,498 children in all.

The SMS1947 was commissioned to test the theory that average intelligence in the United Kingdom was lower in the new generation due to a negative correlation between family size and the intelligence of children. It was carried out on 4 June 1947, and tested the intelligence of 70,805 children, nearly all of Scotland's 1936-born population.

=== Data rediscovery ===
The SMS data was rediscovered by Ian Deary and Lawrence Whalley in the late 1990s. The data had been in the Charteris Land building of the Moray House School of Education at the University of Edinburgh, which was being rented by the SCRE. Recruitment for the Aberdeen area-based follow-up studies of the Scottish Mental Surveys, the Aberdeen Birth Cohorts of 1921 and 1936, began in 1997 and 1999 respectively.

== Design and aims ==
A core aim of the LBC studies is to explore causes of different cognitive ageing outcomes. They have also been used to facilitate a variety of psychosocial, medical and genetic investigations.

Each wave of data collection typically includes: cognitive tests; socio-demographic information; health behaviours and health status; fitness measures; and physical measures. Metabolic and inflammatory biomarkers have also been taken in both cohorts. The studies have been funded by a variety of sources, including but not limited to the Biotechnology and Biological Sciences Research Council, the Medical Research Council, the Scottish Government's Chief Scientist Office, Age UK and Research into Ageing.

=== Lothian Birth Cohort 1921 ===
LBC1921 participant recruitment began in 1999. Participants were mainly recruited by tracing SMS1932 participants in the Edinburgh area using the Community Health Index (CHI), and then asking general practitioners to contact the traced potential LBC participants.

The LBC1921 study's main initial aim was to find molecular genetic markers of healthy cognitive ageing. This included the investigation of the influence of the E4 allele on the Apolipoprotein E (APOE) gene on cognitive ageing as well as testing the effects of other candidate genes for cognitive ageing. A later research focus was examining relationships involving single-nucleotide polymorphisms (SNPs) from genes linked to oxidative stress. The third and fourth waves of data collection were conducted with the main objective of testing the common cause hypothesis of cognitive ageing, which puts forward that age-related declines in physical and cognitive functioning share a common cause.

LBC1921 Wave	Years of data collection	Mean participant age	Number of participants
Wave 1	1999–2001	~79	550
Wave 2	2003–2005	~83	321
Wave 3	2007–2008	~87	235
Wave 4	2011–2012	~90	129

=== Lothian Birth Cohort 1936 ===
LBC1936 participant recruitment started in 2004. Potential participants were identified using the CHI and then sent a letter about the study from the Lothian Health Board.

The LBC1936 study began with the wider objective of investigating a diverse range of influences on cognitive ageing, including the effects of economic, medical, psychological and social variables. For Wave 2, a specific focus was placed on finding how the white matter of the brain becomes damaged and what relationship white matter damage has with age-related cognitive decline.

LBC1936 Wave	Years of data collection	Mean participant age	Number of participants
Wave 1	2004–2007	~70	1091
Wave 2	2007–2010	~73	866
Wave 3	2011–2014	~76	697

== Findings ==
As well as being used to research the topics of major findings outlined below, LBC data has been used in a diverse range of other investigations. For example, LBC1921 participants served as a control group in a study that validated of the use of the National Adult Reading Test as a measure of premorbid cognition in individuals with dementia. LBC1921 data has also been used to find that facial symmetry, as measured by fluctuating asymmetry, is linked to successful cognitive ageing. Data from both Lothian Birth Cohorts has been used to study changes over time in social class mobility and to find strong rank-order stability of personality traits in old age.

=== Stability of intelligence ===
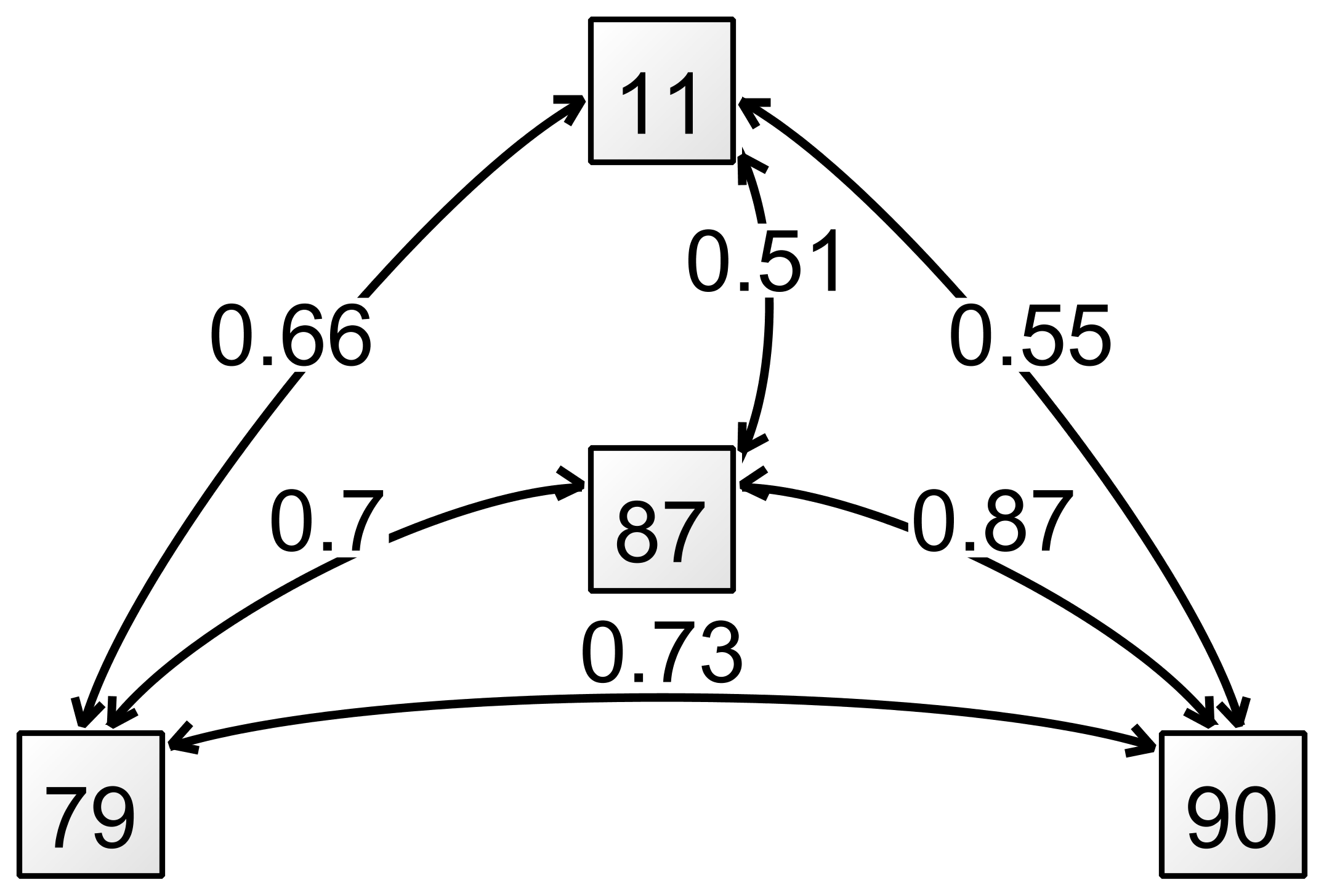
Path diagram of raw correlations (displayed on the double-headed arrows) between Moray House Test scores at different ages (displayed within square boxes) in the LBC1921.

Studies of the LBC1921 have provided the longest-term estimates of the stability of intelligence. They have found that intelligence in childhood is strongly correlated with intelligence in old age, and that this correlation exists because intelligence is highly stable trait, rather than because childhood intelligence is linked to rates of cognitive change during adulthood.

The LBC1921 took the Moray House Test at ages 11, 79, 87 and 90, and results at all four sittings were strongly correlated. The raw correlations between test scores at age 11 and at ages 79, 87 and 90 were .66, .51 and .55 respectively, and they rose to .73, .61 and .67 respectively after correction for the restriction of range in the LBC1921 sample. The range restriction-corrected correlation coefficients represent the best estimate of the stability of intelligence across the entire population of SMS1932 participants, and indicate that intelligence is a very stable trait. Even the corrected coefficients may underestimate the strength of the correlation, as the reliability of the test is likely below 1.0.

Although age 11 intelligence is related to old age intelligence, it has been reported to be unrelated to change in intelligence between ages 79 and 87 in the LBC1921. This finding suggested that childhood intelligence is related to old age intelligence because of the stability of intelligence rather than because it protects against decline in old age.

The LBC1936 also re-sat the Moray House Test in old age. In this larger cohort, there was a strong correlation between scores at ages 11 and 70 of .67.

=== Genetic associations ===
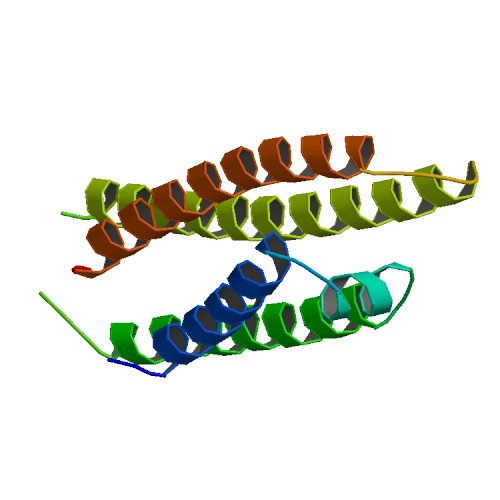
Apolipoprotein E.

The most consistent genetic finding from the LBC studies has been that the E4 allele on the APOE gene, which had previously been known to be a risk factor for late-onset Alzheimer's disease, is also adversely linked to non-pathological cognitive function and change.

In an early LBC1921 study, E4 allele status was unrelated to Moray House Test scores at age 11, but at age 80 those with an E4 allele scored lower than those without an E4 allele, indicating that the allele is a risk factor for cognitive decline. Later LBC1921 research found that possession of the E4 allele was associated with greater decline in abstract reasoning and verbal memory, but not verbal fluency, between age 79 and age 87. Additionally, in the LBC1936, the E4 allele has been associated with worse general cognitive ability at age 70, as well as with worse performance on some specific cognitive tests.

Genome-wide association (GWA) studies have confirmed the APOE E4 allele's association with worse cognitive decline and function. A GWA study of longitudinal cohorts, including the LBC1921 and the LBC1936, found that the APOE E4 allele was associated with deleterious cognitive change. Furthermore, a 2015 meta-analysis of GWA studies in 31 cohorts, including the two Lothian Birth Cohorts, found that the APOE gene as well as SNPs on the APOE/TOMM40 genomic region were associated with general cognitive ability. Altogether, the HMGN1 gene, 13 SNPs and four candidate genes, including APOE, were statistically significant predictors of general cognitive function.

Data from both cohorts was also used, in combination with other data, to establish that intelligence is highly polygenic. In addition, LBC1921 and LBC1936 data was used in calculating the first estimate of the genetic correlation between childhood and old age intelligence in unrelated individuals, which was .62 and therefore indicated that most of the stable variance in intelligence throughout life is attributable to genes rather than environment.

Lothian Birth Cohort data has also been a part of GWA studies for various medical outcomes including cancer, stroke, lung function, arterial pressure and platelet formation.

=== White matter integrity ===
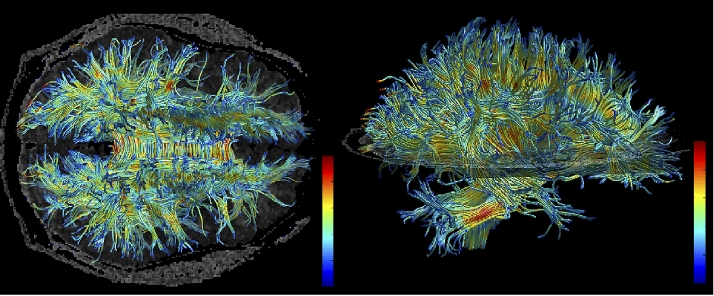
The structure of the white matter of the human brain.

Structural magnetic resonance imaging brain scans from LBC1936 participants have been used to observe that the integrity of white matter tracts in the brain is linked to cognitive functioning and successful cognitive ageing. In one study, three general factors of white matter tract integrity, a global trait of the brain, combined to explain 10% of the variance in general intelligence, and this effect was fully mediated through processing speed. Later investigation of the associations of specific white matter tracts with g and specific cognitive abilities found that most specific tract associations were with g rather than specific abilities, though some associations with specific abilities remained after accounting for associations with g.

White matter integrity has also been shown to relate to cognitive change. Specifically, white matter integrity in the splenium of the corpus callosum has been found to be a marker of healthy cognitive ageing. Lower white matter hyperintensity load has also been considered a sign of successful cognitive ageing, because it was associated with higher general cognitive ability and faster processing speed at age 73 after age 11 intelligence was controlled for.

Additionally, white matter integrity in some brain areas has been found to be weaker in APOE E4 allele carriers, and weaker white matter integrity has been shown to partially mediate some of the harmful effects of the E4 allele on cognitive change.

=== Health, health behaviours and cognitive ageing ===
In the LBC1921, smoking was linked to greater cognitive decline at age 80. The mean IQ of current smokers was 6.0 points lower than the mean IQ of ex-smokers and 6.5 points lower than the mean IQ of those who had never smoked.

Physical fitness, indexed by a general component extracted from measures of lung function, grip strength and walk time, was associated with successful cognitive ageing at age 79 in the LBC1921. Physical activity has also been associated with successful cognitive ageing in the LBC1936, as it remained associated with age 70 general cognitive ability and processing speed after controlling for intelligence at age 11.

One of the strengths of the LBC study designs is that they enable tests of reverse causation in associations between intelligence and other variables. Reverse causation is implied if a contemporaneous association in old age is attenuated or eliminated after childhood intelligence is controlled for, which would suggest that the association existed partially or wholly due to the effects of earlier intelligence. Reverse causation has been separately reported for relationships in the LBC1936 between intelligence and each of caffeine consumption, body mass index, alcohol consumption and inflammation.

== See also ==
- Genetic Studies of Genius
- Minnesota Center for Twin and Family Research
- Minnesota Transracial Adoption Study
- Study of Mathematically Precocious Youth
