= The g Factor: General Intelligence and Its Implications =

1996 book by Chris Brand

The G Factor: General Intelligence and Its Implications
- Author: Christopher Brand
- Publisher: John Wiley & Sons
- Publication date: January 1996
- Pages: 270
- ISBN: 0-471-96069-1

The g Factor: General Intelligence and Its Implications is a book by Christopher Brand, a psychologist and lecturer at the University of Edinburgh. It was published by John Wiley & Sons in the United Kingdom in March 1996. The book was "depublished" by the publishing house on April 17, which cited "deep ethical beliefs" in its decision to remove the book from circulation; it is generally agreed that material in the book that covered racial issues in intelligence testing was responsible for the withdrawal. Wiley argued that after "inflammatory statements" Brand had made elsewhere, it was possible to "infer some of the same repugnant views from the text".

According to economist Edward M. Miller, "While Wiley has not been specific as to just what views that were trying to prevent the dissemination of, one presumes they have to do with racial differences in intelligence and the implications for economics and educational policy."

In a different review, H.J. Eysenck (Personality and Individual Differences, Vol. 21, No. 5, 1996) wrote concerning the decision by Wiley:

the publishers have withdrawn the book, following an unprecedented public onslaught on it by reviewers in many national newspapers who clearly have never read, and would have great difficulties in understanding it, and have no intention in providing a fair account of its contents. They concentrated their fire on the few pages dealing with racial issues, calling into question the scientific knowledge and competence of the author, in spite of the fact that nothing he had to say went beyond what the recent report of the task force set up by A.P.A. acknowledged to be fact. In this total disregard of what the book was actually about, the press followed its own precedent in dealing with The Bell Curve, where also it concentrated on a small part of the book, disregarded the past, and misrepresented what Herrnstein and Murray actually said.

While Eysenck chose to highlight connections between Brand's book and that of Herrnstein and Murray, an editorial in New Scientist took issue with the comparison and criticized both Brand's research and Wiley's decision:

It is a very different book from the Bell Curve ... Brand's book traverses every step of the chain of logic needed to see IQ as critical for social and educational policy: that there is something measurable called general intelligence ("g"), that differences in "g" are strongly influenced by genetic factors (although Brand allows for environmental factors, he estimates that about 45 per cent of the variation in intelligence is due to "narrow" genetic factors), and that "g" is an accurate predictor of success in life. Along that chain there are far too many shaky steps for his thesis to be acceptable to many scientists, whether it is in the way IQ heritability is measured or the very debatable link between IQ and success.

The text of the book has been released as an electronic download by Philippe Gouillou.
