= Socioemotional adaptation theory =

Socioemotional adaptation theory is a theory of emotional changes associated with Alzheimer's disease.

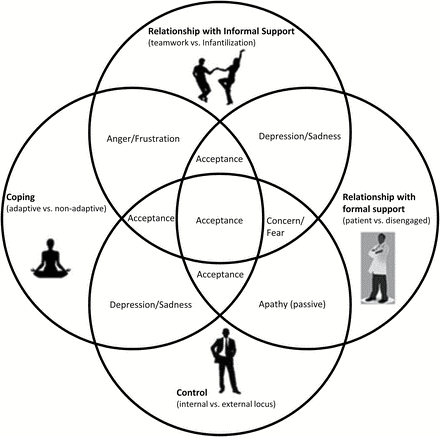
Socio-emotional Adaptation Theory figure 1

The emotional reactions associated with Alzheimer's disease tend to present as cognitive or behavioral symptoms, leading to interventions that do not treat the underlying emotional trigger. Socioemotional adaptation theory outlines four contextual domains that interact to result in emotional states which manifest independent of Alzheimer's disease. Specifically, emotions of depression/sadness, apathy, concern/fear, anger/frustration, and acceptance are entwined within a set of complex binary (positive/negative) interactions including: relationship with the formal support (i.e., patient vs. disengaged), relationship with the support partner (i.e., teamwork vs. infantilization), coping (i.e., adaptive vs. non-adaptive), and perceived control (i.e., internal vs. external locus-of-control). Understanding the factors which may contribute to emotional changes in persons with Alzheimer's disease may help patients, informal support partners, and formal caregivers identify and address the root cause of these emotional changes.
