= Psychomotor learning =

Cognitive functions and physical movement

Psychomotor learning is the relationship between cognitive functions and physical movement. Psychomotor learning is demonstrated by physical skills such as movement, coordination, manipulation, dexterity, grace, strength, speed—actions which demonstrate the fine or gross motor skills, such as use of precision instruments or tools, and walking. Sports and dance are the richest realms of gross psychomotor skills.

Behavioral examples include driving a car, throwing a ball, and playing a musical instrument. In psychomotor learning research, attention is given to the learning of coordinated activity involving the arms, hands, fingers, and feet, while verbal processes are not emphasized.

== Stages of psychomotor development ==
According to Paul Fitts and Michael Posner's three-stage model, when learning psychomotor skills, individuals progress through the cognitive stages, the associative stage, and the autonomic stage. The cognitive stage is marked by awkward slow and choppy movements that the learner tries to control. The learner has to think about each movement before attempting it. In the associative stage, the learner spends less time thinking about every detail, however, the movements are still not a permanent part of the brain. In the autonomic stage, the learner can refine the skill through practice, but no longer needs to think about the movement.

=== Factors affecting psychomotor skills ===
- Psychological feedback
- Amount of practice
- Task complexity
- Work distribution
- Motive-incentive conditions
- Environmental factors

== How motor behaviors are recorded ==
The motor cortices are involved in the formation and retention of memories and skills. When an individual learns physical movements, this leads to changes in the motor cortex. The more practiced a movement is, the stronger the neural encoding becomes. A study cited how the cortical areas include neurons that process movements and that these neurons change their behavior during and after being exposed to tasks. Psychomotor learning is not limited to the motor cortex, however.

== See also ==
- Movement in learning
- Psychomotor agitation
- Psychomotor retardation
