= Ian Deary =

Scottish psychologist (born 1954)

Ian J. Deary OBE FBA FRSE FMedSci
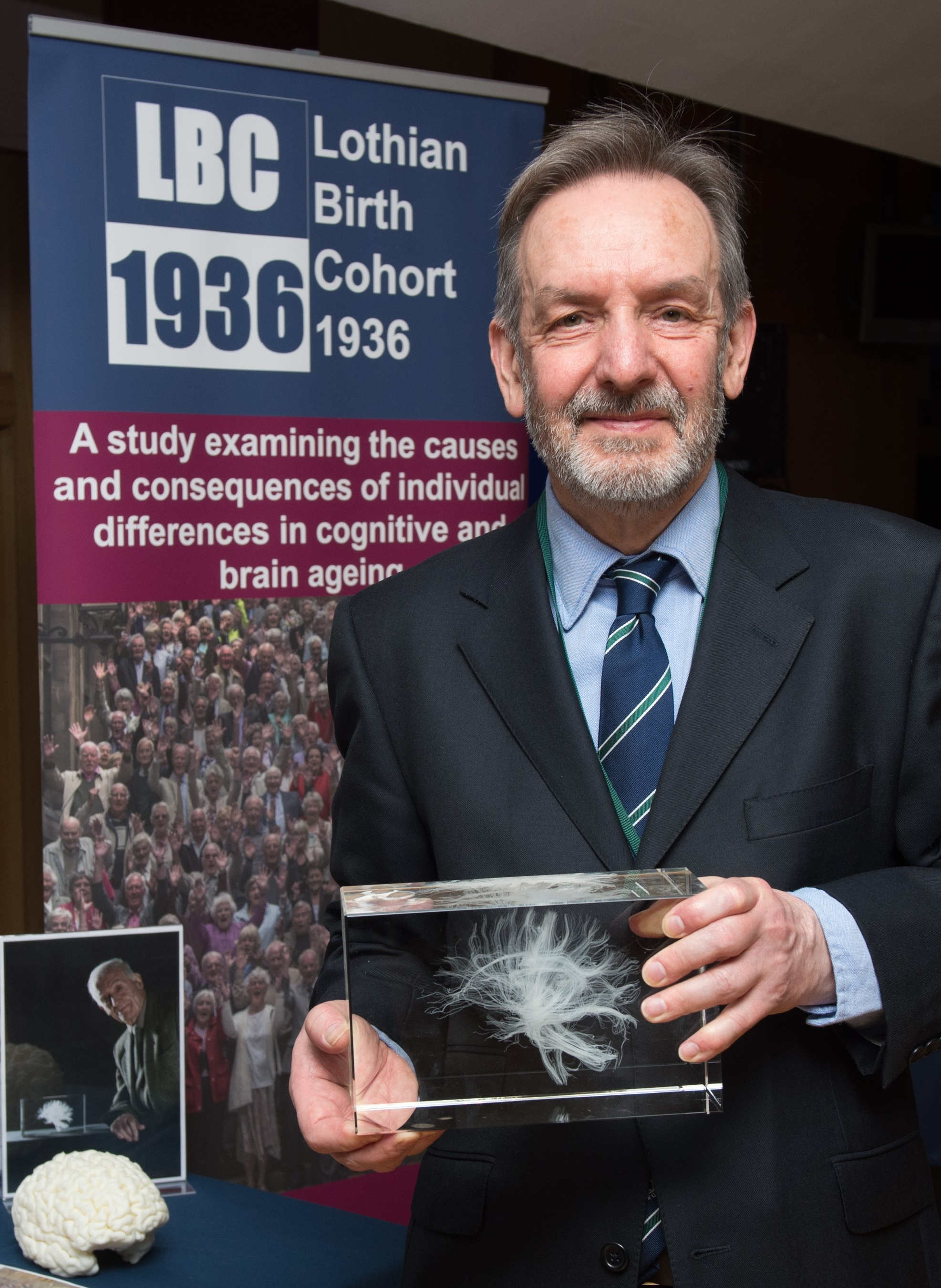
- Deary in 2019
- Born: 17 May 1954 (age 72)
- Education: The University of Edinburgh
- Known for: Research on intelligence, personality, ageing, and cognitive epidemiology
- Scientific career
- Fields: Psychology, Medicine, Epidemiology, Genetics, Behavior Genetics, Neuroscience
- Workplaces: The University of Edinburgh
- Doctoral advisor: Chris Brand

Ian John Deary (born 1954) is a Scottish psychologist (also dual trained as a medical doctor and psychiatrist) known for work in the fields of intelligence, cognitive ageing, cognitive epidemiology, and personality.

Deary is professor of differential psychology at The University of Edinburgh. He is former director of the Centre for Cognitive Ageing and Cognitive Epidemiology and co-director of the Alzheimer Scotland Dementia Research Centre.

== Research ==
Ian Deary has contributed to numerous topics in intelligence research. For instance, he has conducted several studies into the relationship between intelligence and elementary cognitive tasks such as reaction time and inspection time, and has investigated the overlap between intelligence and educational achievement.

In 1983 he obtained a PhD at the University of Edinburgh with the thesis "Social work and the elderly: a problem of definition" written for the Stuart Macgregor Memorial Prize.

Deary was a founder of the field of cognitive epidemiology, which studies the relationship of intelligence to health outcomes. He described and discussed cognitive epidemiology in a 2010 article for the journal Psychological Science in the Public Interest.

A 2010 review in Nature Reviews Neuroscience, co-authored by Deary, described research on the neuroscience of intelligence differences. In 2012, the journal Annual Review of Psychology published an overview of the field of intelligence research, authored by Deary.

=== Lothian Birth Cohort studies ===
Deary was one of the co-founders of the Lothian Birth Cohort studies of 1921 and 1936. These studies collect data from older Scottish individuals who, aged 11, had their intelligence tested as part of the Scottish Mental Surveys of 1932 and 1947. From the year 2000 onward, Deary and colleagues contacted surviving members of these surveys living in the Edinburgh and Lothians areas and invited them to retake the same intelligence test, along with further batteries of cognitive tests. Members of the cohorts born in 1921 were followed up at age of 79, and those born in 1936 at age 70. Interview and biomedical data were also collected from the cohort members to allow wide-ranging investigation of the causes and consequences of differences in cognition across the lifespan.

Using data from the Lothian Birth Cohort studies, Deary and colleagues have investigated the effects of ageing on cognition. For instance, studies have shown that intelligence between age 11 and age 79 is highly stable (correlation of around r = .66), and that childhood and old age intelligence have a genetic correlation of .62. A number of papers from the Lothian Birth Cohort studies, co-authored by Deary, have reported that higher childhood intelligence scores negatively predict earlier mortality; that is, more intelligent people live longer.

Data from the Lothian Birth Cohort studies continue to be used for studies of the relationship of intelligence to a wide variety of health, educational and socioeconomic outcomes. In addition, genetic and brain imaging data from members of the Cohorts allow investigation of the biological causes of differences in intelligence and cognitive ageing.

== Awards and recognition ==
Ian Deary is a fellow of the Royal College of Physicians of Edinburgh, the Royal Society of Edinburgh, the British Academy, the Academy of Medical Sciences, the Royal College of Psychiatrists, and the Association for Psychological Science. He is a past president of the International Society for the Study of Individual Differences, and has held a Royal Society-Wolfson Research Merit Award (2003–2007) for research into cognitive ageing. In 2003 he received the first of the Chancellor's Awards at the University of Edinburgh, and in 2010 was named as a Distinguished European Personality Psychologist by the European Association of Personality Psychology. In 2014, Deary received the Lifetime Achievement Award from the International Society for Intelligence Research, and received the James McKeen Cattell Fellow Award from the Association for Psychological Science in 2015. In the 2019 New Year Honours, Deary was awarded an OBE for services to the Social Sciences.

=== Books ===
- Deary, I. J. (2000). Looking Down on Human Intelligence: From Psychometrics to the Brain. Oxford, UK: Oxford University Press.
- Deary, I. J. (2001). Intelligence: A Very Short Introduction. Oxford, UK: Oxford University Press.
- Matthews, G., Deary, I. J., & Whiteman, M. C. (2009). Personality Traits (3rd Edition). Cambridge, UK: Cambridge University Press.
- Deary, I. J., Whalley, L. J., & Starr, J. M. (2009). A Lifetime of Intelligence. Washington, DC: American Psychological Association.
