= National Adult Reading Test =

- Purpose: estimating premorbid intelligence

The National Adult Reading Test (NART) is a widely accepted and commonly used method in clinical settings for estimating premorbid intelligence levels of (initially) English-speaking patients with dementia in neuropsychological research and practice. Such tests are called hold tests as these abilities are thought to be spared, or "held" following neurological injury or decline. The NART was developed by Hazel Nelson in the 1980s in Britain and published in 1982. The test comprises 50 written words in British English which all have irregular spellings (e.g. "aisle"), so as to test the participant's vocabulary rather than their ability to apply regular pronunciation rules. The manual includes equations for converting NART scores to predicted IQ scores on the Wechsler Adult Intelligence Scale.

The NART is widely used in research settings because a measure of premorbid intelligence is rarely available. However, the Lothian Birth Cohort Study has such data. Researchers from this study demonstrated that the correlation between NART scores and age 11 IQ was moderately high at 0.60. This suggests that the NART can be used as a hold test, as a proxy for premorbid intelligence. Other work has suggested that NART offers greater predictive validity than using demographic data alone, or use of the best performing IQ sub-test score.

== Revisions ==
The British NART was re-standardized in 1991 to enable calculation of predicted IQ on the newer WAIS-R and again in 2016 to provide premorbid estimates on the most recent WAIS-IV. There are two versions of the NART devised for use in North America; both feature a modified word list and re-standardization of predicted IQ. The NART-R, published in 1989, was designed for use in the United States and Canada. NART-R comprises an extended list of 61 words chosen to have irregular pronunciations in North American English. The AMNART was developed independently in 1987 but unpublished until 1991 and comprises 50 words selected to be familiar to speakers of American English (for example gaoled and drachm were removed). There is also a New Zealand version called NZART, an Australian version called AUSNART, a Swedish version called NART-SWE, a Polish version called PART, a Korean version called KART, a French version called fNART, a Japanese version called JART, and a Danish called DART. Norwegian and Dutch versions have also been proposed. A number of abbreviated versions have also been proposed, along with a variant that presents test words in semantic and syntactic context. The validity prediction limits of many of the international and abbreviated variants have been evaluated, indicating good performance for a broad range of IQ scores but with a reduced capability to accurately assess patients of very high or very low premorbid ability.
