= Odd Man Out Tour =

2005 concert tour

- Tour by Ben Folds, Ben Lee, and Rufus Wainwright
- Location: United States
- Start date: August 3, 2005
- End date: August 27, 2005
- No. of shows: 17

The Odd Man Out Tour was a 2005 concert tour co-headlined by Ben Folds, Ben Lee, and Rufus Wainwright. The tour began in Vienna, Virginia, on August 3.

== Tour dates ==
Date	City	Country	Venue
August 2, 2005	State College	United States	Bryce Jordan Center
August 3, 2005	Vienna	United States	Wolf Trap Filene Center
August 4, 2005	New York City	United States	Prospect Park
August 5, 2005	Boston	United States	Bank of America Pavilion
August 7, 2005	Atlantic City	United States	Borgata Resort Spa & Casino
August 10, 2005	Highland Park	United States	Ravinia Festival
August 11, 2005	Columbus	United States	Promowest Pavilion
August 13, 2005	Kansas City	United States	City Market
August 14, 2005	Tulsa	United States	Brady Theater
August 16, 2005	Denver	United States	The Filmore Auditorium
August 18, 2005	Los Angeles	United States	Wiltern Theatre
August 19, 2005	Los Angeles	United States	Wiltern Theatre
August 20, 2005	Las Vegas	United States	The Joint
August 21, 2005	San Diego	United States	Copley Symphony Hall
August 23, 2005	San Francisco	United States	Davies Symphony Hall
August 24, 2005	Saratoga	United States	The Mountain Winery
August 26, 2005	Woodinville	United States	Chateau Ste. Michelle Winery
August 27, 2005	Portland	United States	Roseland Theatre
