= The Journal of Genetic Psychology =

- Discipline: Developmental psychology
- Language: English
- Edited by: Gianluca Esposito

Publication details
- Former names: The Pedagogical Seminary, The Pedagogical Seminary and Journal of Genetic Psychology
- History: 1891-present
- Publisher: Taylor & Francis
- Frequency: Quarterly

Standard abbreviations
- ISO 4: J. Genet. Psychol.

Indexing
- CODEN: JGPYAI
- ISSN: 0022-1325 (print); 1940-0896 (web)
- LCCN: 06012252
- OCLC no.: 643471635

Links
- Journal homepage; Online access; Online archive

The Journal of Genetic Psychology: Research and Theory on Human Development is a quarterly peer-reviewed scientific journal covering developmental psychology. The first scholarly journal devoted to the field of developmental psychology, it was established in 1891 by G. Stanley Hall as The Pedagogical Seminary, and was renamed The Pedagogical Seminary and Journal of Genetic Psychology in 1924. In 1954, the journal obtained its current name. It is published by Taylor & Francis and the editor-in-chief is Gianluca Esposito, University of Trento.
