= Odd Man Out (play) =

Play by David Williamson

- Original language: English
- Written by: David Williamson
- Genre: comedy

Premiere
- Date: 2017
- Place: Ensemble Theatre, Sydney

Odd Man Out is an Australian comedy play by David Williamson.

== Plot ==
Alice marries the straight-talking Ryan, but soon discovers that he has Asperger's.

== Production ==
The play premiered at the Ensemble Theatre in Sydney in January 2017.

Williamson said, "My abiding interest these days is in social psychology, in group dynamics, in the way people try to consciously or subconsciously raise their self esteem or look for love and social acceptance.. I read a hell of a lot on marriages between Aspberger's men and neurotypical women. The struggle to cope can be quite severe... What I do really is the work of a social psychologist on stage. I'm more a psychologist than I am a playwright."

The premiere starred Lisa Gormley who described the play as “an unconventional romantic comedy... a very positive exploration of a relationship between a neurotypical woman and a man who has undiagnosed high functioning autism at the beginning of the play. The main theme is a couple dealing with the fact that one is naturally socially adept and one isn’t quite so good at that — and that’s where a lot of the comedy comes from.”
