= Psychologica Belgica =

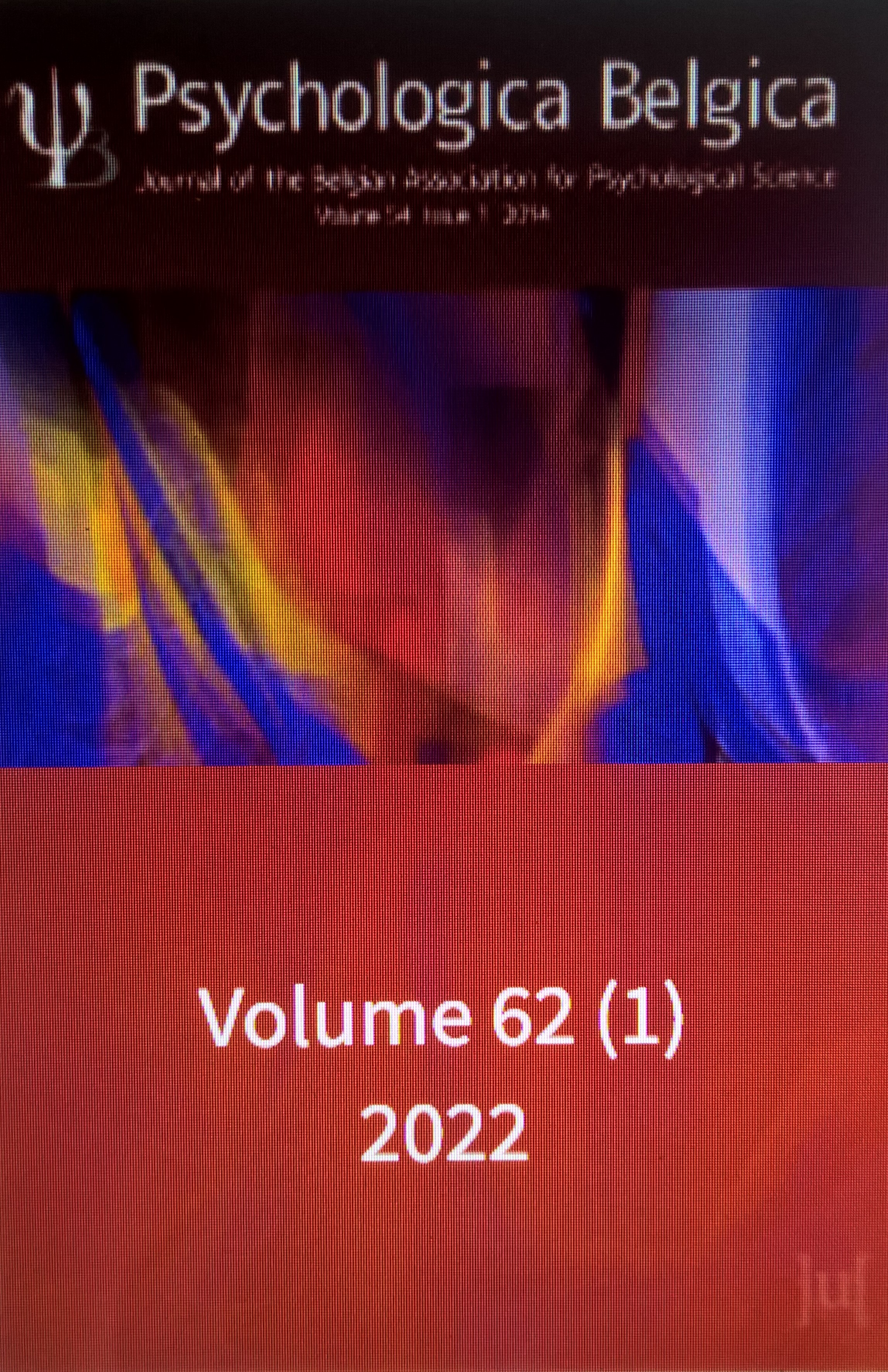
- Discipline: Psychology
- Language: English
- Edited by: Ruth Krebs

Publication details
- History: 1951-present
- Publisher: Ubiquity Press on behalf of the Belgian Association for Psychological Sciences (Belgium)
- Frequency: Quarterly
- Open access: Yes
- License: CC BY 3.0
- Impact factor: 2.00 (2022)

Standard abbreviations
- ISO 4: Psychol. Belg.

Indexing
- CODEN: PBELAN
- ISSN: 0033-2879 (print); 2054-670X (web)
- LCCN: 56043662
- OCLC no.: 643776398

Links
- Journal homepage; Online access; Online access

Psychologica Belgica is a peer-reviewed, open access academic journal of psychology. It is published by Ubiquity Press and is the official journal of the Belgian Association for Psychological Sciences. The current editor-in-chief is Ruth Krebs (Gent University).

== History ==
The Belgian Association for Psychological Sciences was founded in 1946 by Albert Michotte and the first issue of the journal was published in 1951.
