= SPATS2L =

Human protein

Identifiers
- Aliases: SPATS2L, DNAPTP6, SGNP, spermatogenesis associated serine rich 2 like
- External IDs: OMIM: 613817; MGI: 1914448; HomoloGene: 56711; GeneCards: SPATS2L; OMA:SPATS2L - orthologs

Gene location (Human)
Chr.	Chromosome 2 (human)
Band	2q33.1	Start	200,305,881 bp
Band	2q33.1	End	200,482,264 bp

Gene location (Mouse)
Chr.	Chromosome 1 (mouse)
Band	1|1 C1.3	Start	57,813,321 bp
Band	1|1 C1.3	End	57,987,553 bp
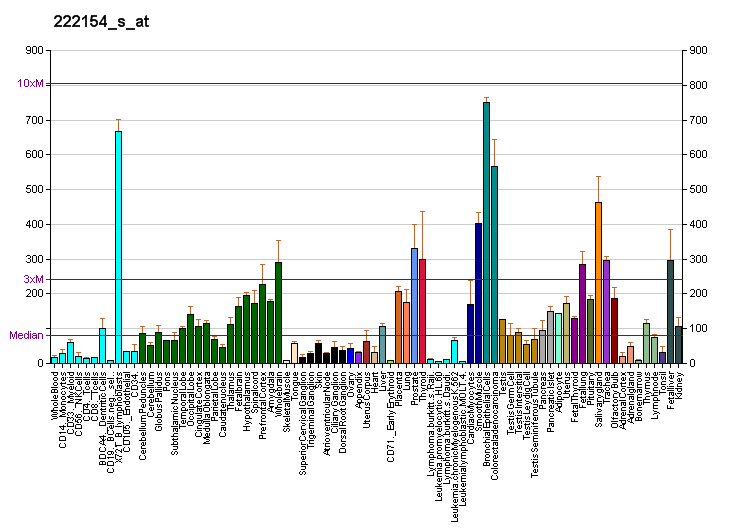
RNA expression pattern
Bgee	Human / Mouse (ortholog); Top expressed in: pancreatic ductal cell; parotid gland; metanephric glomerulus; gallbladder; tibia; stromal cell of endometrium; mucosa of colon; mucosa of sigmoid colon; mucosa of ileum; cardiac muscle tissue of right atrium / Top expressed in: mucous cell of stomach; vestibular membrane of cochlear duct; human fetus; condyle; efferent ductule; dermis; vestibular sensory epithelium; pyloric antrum; fossa; atrium; More reference expression data
BioGPS	More reference expression data
Orthologs
Species	Human	Mouse
Entrez	26010	67198
Ensembl	ENSG00000196141	ENSMUSG00000038305
UniProt	Q9NUQ6	Q91WJ7
RefSeq (mRNA)	NM_001100422; NM_001100423; NM_001100424; NM_001282735; NM_001282743 NM_001282744; NM_015535	NM_001164566; NM_144882; NM_001368787
RefSeq (protein)	NP_001093892; NP_001093893; NP_001093894; NP_001269664; NP_001269672 NP_001269673; NP_056350	NP_001158038; NP_659131; NP_001355716
Location (UCSC)	Chr 2: 200.31 – 200.48 Mb	Chr 1: 57.81 – 57.99 Mb
PubMed search
- Wikidata
View/Edit Human	View/Edit Mouse

SPATS2-like protein (spermatogenesis associated, serine-rich 2-like protein) or DNAPTP6 (DNA polymerase transactivated protein 6) is a protein that in humans is encoded by the SPATS2L gene.
