= Premorbidity =

State of functionality prior to the onset of a disease or illness

Premorbidity refers to the state of functionality prior to the onset of a disease or illness. It is most often used in relation to psychological function (e.g. premorbid personality or premorbid intelligence), but can also be used in relation to other medical conditions (e.g. premorbid lung function or premorbid heart rate).

== Psychology ==
In psychology, premorbidity is most often used in relation to changes in personality, intelligence or cognitive function. Changes in personality are common in cases of traumatic brain injury involving the frontal lobes, the most famous example of this is the case of Phineas Gage who survived having a tamping iron shot through his head in a railway construction accident. Declines from premorbid levels of intelligence and other cognitive functions are observed in stroke, traumatic brain injury, and dementia as well as in mental illnesses such as depression and schizophrenia.

Other usage in psychology include premorbid adjustment which has important implications for the prognosis of mental illness such as schizophrenia. Efforts are also being made to identify premorbid personality profiles for certain illness, such as schizophrenia to determine at risk populations.

== Clinical and diagnostic usage ==
In the Diagnostic and Statistical Manual of Mental Disorders, Fourth Edition, Text Revision (DSM-IV-TR), paranoid, schizoid, and schizotypal personality disorders may be diagnosed as conditions premorbid to the onset of schizophrenia.

== See also ==
- Prodrome
