= Kenneth Craik =

Scottish philosopher and psychologist (1914–1945)

- Born: Kenneth James William Craik; 29 March 1914; Edinburgh, Scotland
- Died: 8 May 1945 (aged 31); Cambridge, England
- Known for: Intermittent control

Academic background
- Education: University of Edinburgh
- Thesis: The Experimental Study of Visual Adaptation (1940)

Academic work
- Influenced: Warren McCulloch

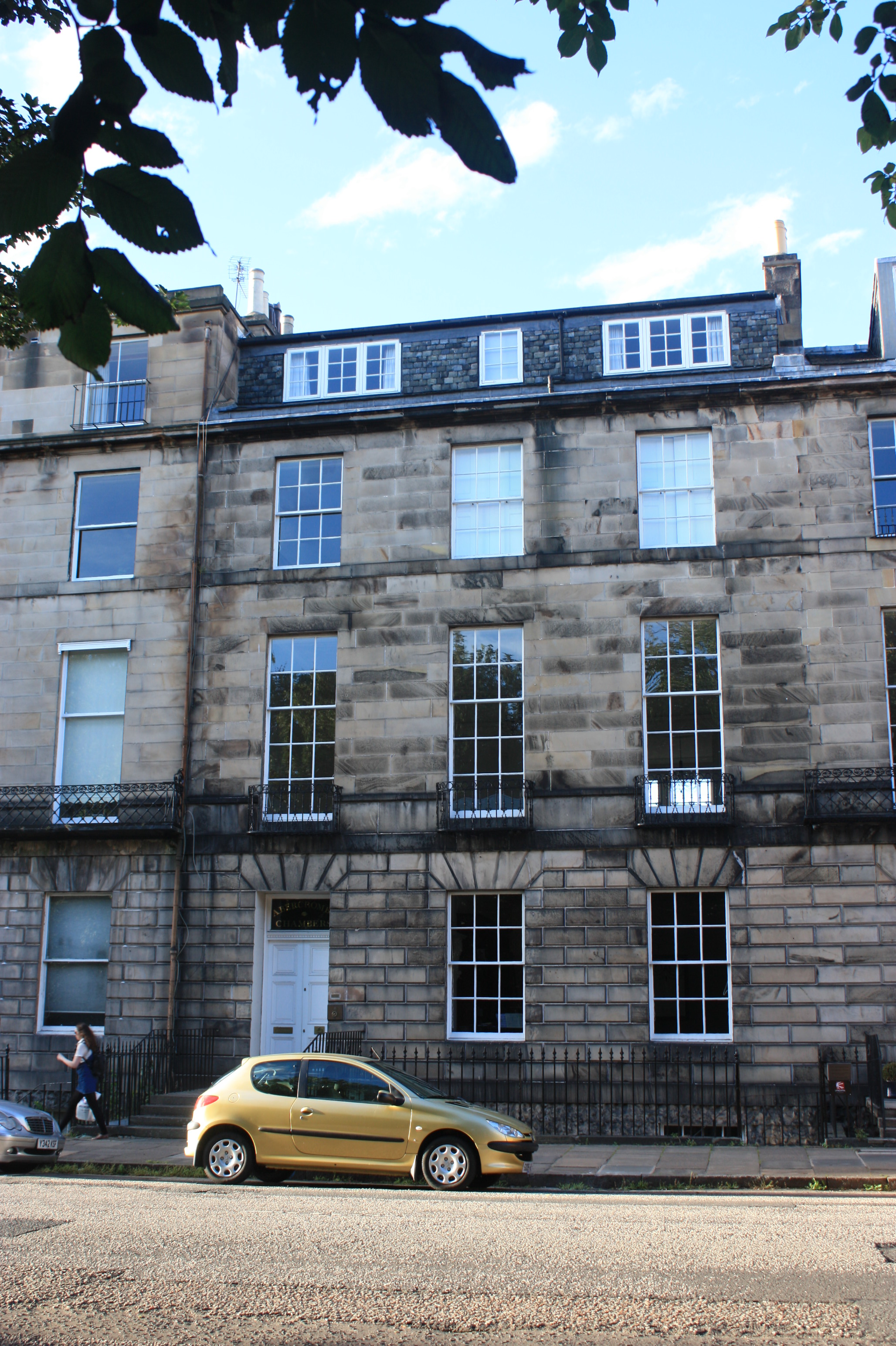
13 Abercromby Place, Edinburgh

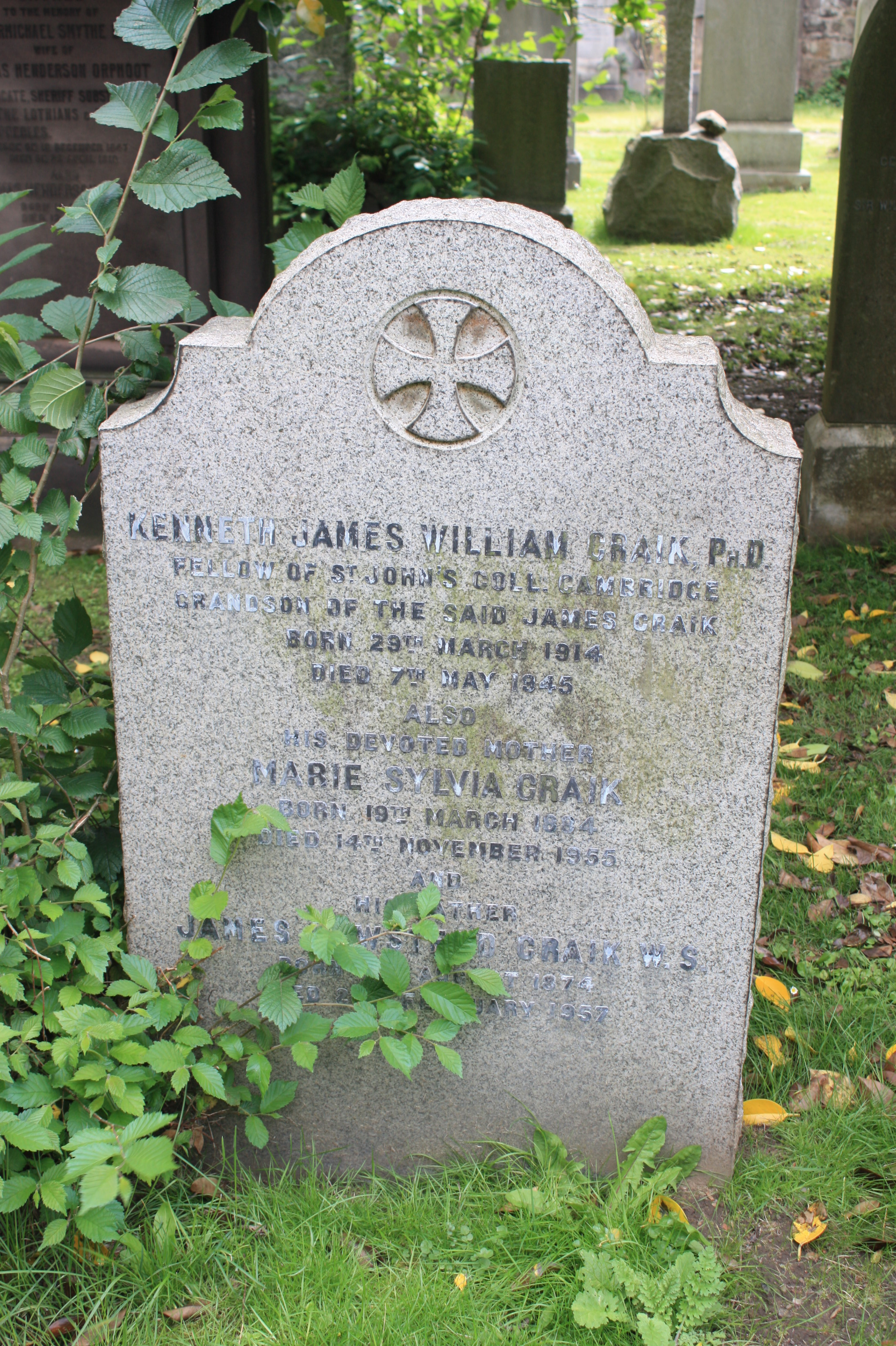
The grave of Kenneth Craik, Dean Cemetery, Edinburgh

Kenneth James William Craik (/kreɪk/; 1914–1945) was a Scottish philosopher and psychologist. A pioneer of cybernetics, he hypothesized that any human behaves basically as a servomechanism that executes control at discrete points in time. He influenced Warren McCulloch, who once recounted that Einstein considered The Nature of Explanation a great book.

== Life ==
He was born in Edinburgh on 29 March 1914, the son of James Bowstead Craik, an Edinburgh lawyer, and Marie Sylvia Craik (née Robson), a published novelist. The family lived at 13 Abercromby Place in Edinburgh's Second New Town (previously the home of William Trotter). He was educated at Edinburgh Academy then studied philosophy at the University of Edinburgh. He received his doctorate from Cambridge University in 1940. He then had a fellowship to St John's College, Cambridge in 1941, where he worked with Magdalen Dorothea Vernon and published papers with her about dark adaptation in 1941 and 1943. He was appointed to be the first director of the Medical Research Council's Cambridge-based Applied Psychology Unit in 1944.

During the Second World War he served in the fire-fighting sections of the Civil Defence. Together with Gordon Butler Iles he made major advances on flight simulators for the RAF and did major studies on the effects of fatigue on pilots.

He died at the age of 31 following a crash, where a car struck his bicycle on the Kings Parade in Cambridge on 7 May 1945. He died in hospital on the following day: VE Day. He is buried in the northern section of Dean Cemetery. His parents Marie Sylvia Craik and James Craik were later buried with him.

Craik's work was admired and considered as an important influence by several early researchers in cybernetics. When the Ratio Club of early British cyberneticians was founded in 1949, its founder, neurophysiologist John Bates, expressed his disappointment that he was unable to invite the already-deceased Craik. It had been proposed to name the club after him; "had he survived, there is no doubt Craik would have been a leading member of the club" (according to Husbands and Holland). Several members had worked or interacted with Craik, including W. Grey Walter who credited a wartime talk with Craik with inspiring his pioneering "tortoise" robots. In 1947 Walter described early North American cyberneticians including Norbert Wiener, McCulloch and Arturo Rosenblueth as "thinking on very much the same lines as Kenneth Craik did, but with much less sparkle and humour.". (In turn Bates and club member W. E. Hick considered that Craik had been influenced by Ratio Club member Albert Uttley.) In the proposal document for the influential 1956 Dartmouth workshop on artificial intelligence, Nathaniel Rochester discusses the problem of machine learning in terms of a model of learning from The Nature of Explanation.

The Kenneth Craik Club (an interdisciplinary seminar series in the fields of sensory science and neurobiology) and the Craik-Marshall Building in Cambridge are named in tribute to Craik. The Kenneth Craik Research Award administered by St John's College was established in his memory in 1945.

== Works ==
In 1943 he wrote The Nature of Explanation. In this book he first laid the foundation for the concept of mental models, that the mind forms models of reality and uses them to predict similar future events. He is recognized as one of the pioneers of modern cognitive science.

A servomechanism negative-feedback loop.

In 1947 and 1948 his two-part paper on the "Theory of Human Operators in Control Systems" was published posthumously by the British Journal of Psychology. In this paper, he argued that the human is an intermittent servomechanism performing serial ballistic control. In more detail, he hypothesized, based on multiple early experiments in human cognitive and motor control, that in motion planning, a human operates as a negative-feedback loop. The human continuously takes in sensory information, but does not continuously perform actions. Instead, once every ~0.5 seconds, the human selects an action. The selected action is then implemented by an open-loop controller that operate for ~0.2 seconds ("ballistic movement"). As the human learns, the motion performed by the open-loop controller becomes more refined, allowing the human system to approach an ideal continuous-time servomechanism.

An anthology of Craik's writings, edited by Stephen L. Sherwood, was published in 1966 as The Nature of Psychology: A Selection of Papers, Essays and Other Writings by Kenneth J. W. Craik.

== Bibliography ==
Craik, K. J. W. (January 1939). "The effect of adaptation upon visual acuity". British Journal of Psychology. General Section. 29 (3): 252–266. doi:10.1111/j.2044-8295.1939.tb00917.x.

Craik, K. J. W.; Zangwill, O. L. (October 1939). "Observations relating to the threshold of a small figure within the contour of a closed-lined figure". British Journal of Psychology. General Section. 30 (2): 139–150. doi:10.1111/j.2044-8295.1939.tb00948.x.

Craik, K. J. W.; Vernon, M. D. (July 1941). "The nature of dark adaptation". British Journal of Psychology. General Section. 32 (1): 62–81. doi:10.1111/j.2044-8295.1941.tb01010.x.

Craik, K. J. W.; Vernon, M. D. (January 1942). "Perception during dark adaptation". British Journal of Psychology. General Section. 32 (3): 206–230. doi:10.1111/j.2044-8295.1942.tb01021.x.

Craik, Kenneth J. W. (1943). The Nature of Explanation. Cambridge: Cambridge University Press. ISBN 978-0521094450.

Craik, Kenneth J. W. (December 1947). "Theory of the human operator in control systems. I: The operator as an engineering system". British Journal of Psychology. General Section. 38 (2): 56–61. doi:10.1111/j.2044-8295.1947.tb01141.x. PMID 18917476.

Craik, Kenneth J. W. (March 1948). "Theory of the human operator in control systems. II: Man as an element in a control system". British Journal of Psychology. General Section. 38 (3): 142–148. doi:10.1111/j.2044-8295.1948.tb01149.x. PMID 18913657.

Craik, Kenneth J. W. (1966). Sherwood, Stephen L. (ed.). The Nature of Psychology: A Selection of Papers, Essays and Other Writings by Kenneth J. W. Craik. Cambridge: Cambridge University Press. ISBN 978-0521134804.
