= Albert Uttley =

English scientist

- Born: Albert Maurel Uttley; August 14, 1906; London, England
- Died: September 13, 1985 (aged 79); Bexhill, England
- Education: King's College London (Psychology, Mathematics, PhD)
- Known for: Member of the Ratio Club; Conditional-probability neural networks for pattern recognition Hebbian learning in neural networks
- Spouse: Gwendoline Lucy Richens
- Scientific career
- Fields: Computing, cybernetics, neurophysiology, psychology

Albert Maurel Uttley (14 August, 1906, London – 13 September, 1985 Bexhill) was an English scientist involved in computing, cybernetics, neurophysiology and psychology. He was a member of the Ratio Club and was the person who suggested its name.

Uttley received both a degree in Psychology and an honours degree in Mathematics from King's College, London, where he also did postgraduate research in visual perception. (He achieved a Ph.D. no later than 1946.)

He was designing conditional-probability neural nets for pattern recognition for the British military. He showed that neural networks with Hebbian learning rules could learn to classify binary sequences.

In the proposal document for the influential 1956 Dartmouth workshop on artificial intelligence, Uttley is one of the researchers noted for his work on neural networks.

Albert was the son of George and Ethel Uttley. He married Gwendoline Lucy Richens.

== Publications ==
- Williams, F.C.; Uttley, A.M. (1946). "The Velodyne". Journal of the Institution of Electrical Engineers - Part IIIA: Radiolocation. 93 (1). Institution of Electrical Engineers: 317–318. doi:10.1049/ji-3a-1.1946.0108. ISSN 0020-3270.
- Williams, F.C.; Uttley, A.M. (1946). "The Velodyne". Journal of the Institution of Electrical Engineers - Part IIIA: Radiolocation. 93 (7). Institution of Electrical Engineers: 1256–1274. doi:10.1049/ji-3a-1.1946.0211. ISSN 0020-3270.
- Adams, D. E.; Uttley, A. M. (April 1950). "A Survey of Navigation Systems and Instrument Aids". The Journal of Navigation. 3 (2). Royal Institute of Navigation: 141–155. Bibcode:1950JNav....3..141A. doi:10.1017/S0373463300045550. ISSN 0373-4633.
- Adams, D. E.; Uttley, A. M. (May 1950). "Navigational Systems and Instrument Aids". The Journal of the Royal Aeronautical Society. 54 (473). Royal Aeronautical Society: 269–293. doi:10.1017/S0368393100119315. ISSN 0368-3931.
- Uttley, A. M.; Hammond, P. H. (1951). "The Stabilization of On-off Controlled Servo-mechanisms". Automatic and Manual Control. Conference on Automatic Control. Cranfield: Butterworths Scientific Publications (published 1952). pp. 285–299.
- Sholl, D. A.; Uttley, A. M. (28 February 1953). "Pattern Discrimination and the Visual Cortex". Nature. 171 (4348): 387–388. Bibcode:1953Natur.171..387S. doi:10.1038/171387a0. ISSN 1476-4687. PMID 13036904.
- Uttley, A. M. (1953). "The Telecommunications Research Establishment Parallel Electronic Digital Computer". In Bowden, B.V. (ed.). Faster Than Thought. London: Sir Isaac Pitman & Sons Ltd. pp. 144–160.
- "Information, machines, and brains", Trans. of the IRE Professional Group on Information Theory (TIT) 1: 143-149 (1953)
- Uttley, A. M. (1954). "The classification of signals in the nervous system". Electroencephalography and Clinical Neurophysiology. 6 (3): 479–494. doi:10.1016/0013-4694(54)90064-4. ISSN 0013-4694. PMID 13200421.
  - Uttley, A.M. (1954). The Classification of Signals in the Nervous System (Technical report). R.R.E. Memoranda. Royal Radar Establishment. 1047.
- Uttley, A.M. (27 September 1955). "The probability of neural connexions". Proceedings of the Royal Society of London B: Biological Sciences. 6 (915). The Royal Society: 229–240. Bibcode:1955RSPSB.144..229U. doi:10.1098/rspb.1955.0054. ISSN 0080-4649. PMID 13266808.
- "A theory on the mechanism of learning based on the computation of conditional probabilities", Proceedings of the First International Congress on Cybernetics, Naumur 1956 pp.830-856
- Uttley, Albert M. (1956). "Conditional Probability Machines and Conditioned Reflexes". In Shannon, C. E.; McCarthy, J. (eds.). Automata Studies. Annals of Mathematics Studies. Princeton, New Jersey: Princeton University Press. pp. 253–275. doi:10.1515/9781400882618-013. ISBN 0691079161. OCLC 1303422567. Internet Archive copy
- Uttley, Albert M. (1956). "Temporal and Spatial Patterns in a Conditional Probability Machine". In Shannon, C. E.; McCarthy, J. (eds.). Automata Studies. Annals of Mathematics Studies. Princeton, New Jersey: Princeton University Press. pp. 277–285. doi:10.1515/9781400882618-014. ISBN 0691079161. OCLC 1303422567. Internet Archive copy
- Uttley, A. M. (1958). "Conditional Probability Computing in a Nervous System". Mechanisation of Thought Processes. Mechanisation of Thought Processes. Vol. 1. National Physical Laboratory: Her Majesty's Stationery Office (published 1959). pp. 119–147.
- "The Design of Conditional Probability Computers", Information and Control 2(1): 1-24 (1959)
- Uttley, Albert M. (1 April 1959). "Imitation of Pattern Recognition and Trial-and-Error Learning in a Conditional Probability Computer". Reviews of Modern Physics. 31 (2). American Physical Society: 546–548. Bibcode:1959RvMP...31..546U. doi:10.1103/RevModPhys.31.546.
- Uttley, A.M. (1961). "The Engineering Approach to the Problem of Neural Organization". Progress in Biophysics and Biophysical Chemistry. 11. Pergamon Press: 25–52. doi:10.1016/S0096-4174(18)30208-7. ISSN 0096-4174. PMID 13924038.
- Uttley, A.M. (March 1962). "Properties of Plastic Networks". Biophysical Journal. 2 (2, Part 2). Cell Press: 169–188. Bibcode:1962BpJ.....2..169U. doi:10.1016/S0006-3495(62)86954-9. ISSN 0006-3495. PMC 1366482. PMID 13924037.
- Uttley, A.M. (1966). "The transmission of information and the effect of local feedback in theoretical and neural networks". Brain Research. 2 (1): 21–50. doi:10.1016/0006-8993(66)90060-6. ISSN 0006-8993. PMID 5965633.
- Bliss, T. V. P.; Delisle, B.; Uttley, A. M. (1 March 1968). "Factors affecting the conductivity of pathways in the cerebral cortex". The Journal of Physiology. 195 (2): 339–367. doi:10.1113/jphysiol.1968.sp008462. ISSN 0022-3751. PMC 1351667. PMID 5647327.
- Uttley, A.M. (April 1970). "The informon: A network for adaptive pattern recognition". Journal of Theoretical Biology. 27 (1): 31–67. Bibcode:1970JThBi..27...31U. doi:10.1016/0022-5193(70)90128-1. ISSN 0022-5193. PMID 5419908.
- Uttley, A.M. (February 1975). "The informon in classical conditioning". Journal of Theoretical Biology. 49 (2): 355–376. doi:10.1016/0022-5193(75)90178-2. ISSN 0022-5193. PMID 1121184.
- Uttley, Albert M. (March 1975). "The conversion of printed characters into speechlike sound for a blind reading aid". Medical and biological engineering. 13 (2): 285–293. doi:10.1007/BF02477741. ISSN 0140-0118. PMID 1195821.
- Uttley, A.M. (30 January 1976). "A two-pathway informon theory of conditioning and adaptive pattern recognition". Brain Research. 102 (1): 23–35. doi:10.1016/0006-8993(76)90573-4. ISSN 0165-0173. PMID 174779.
- Uttley, A.M. (30 January 1976). "Simulation studies of learning in an informon network". Brain Research. 102 (1): 37–53. doi:10.1016/0006-8993(76)90574-6. ISSN 0165-0173. PMID 174780.
- Uttley, A.M. (30 January 1976). "Neurophysiological predictions of a two-pathway informon theory of neural conditioning". Brain Research. 102 (1): 55–70. doi:10.1016/0006-8993(76)90575-8. ISSN 0165-0173. PMID 174781.
- Uttley, A.M. (7 December 1977). "Methods of simulating the behaviour of granule cells in hippocampus based on informon theory". Journal of Theoretical Biology. 69 (3): 391–399. Bibcode:1977JThBi..69..391U. doi:10.1016/0022-5193(77)90147-3. ISSN 0022-5193. PMID 607012.
- Uttley, A.M. (7 December 1977). "Similarity of behaviour of granule cells in hippocampus to that predicted by informon theory". Journal of Theoretical Biology. 69 (3): 401–413. Bibcode:1977JThBi..69..401U. doi:10.1016/0022-5193(77)90148-5. ISSN 0022-5193. PMID 607013.
- Uttley, A. M. (1979). Information transmission in the nervous system. London: Academic Press. ISBN 0127097503. OCLC 5103526. (Note: Not to be confused with the 1980 Raven Press book of the same title edited by Harold M. Pinsker and William D. Willis, ISBN 0890044228, OCLC 6040580.)
- Uttley, Albert (1982). Brain, mind and spirit. OCLC 847467780.
