= Ratio Club =

Early cybernetics circle

The Ratio Club was a small British informal dining club from 1949 to 1958 of young psychiatrists, psychologists, physiologists, mathematicians and engineers who met to discuss issues in cybernetics.

== History ==
The idea of the club arose from a symposium on animal behaviour held in July 1949 by the Society of Experimental Biology in Cambridge. The club was founded by the neurologist John Bates, with other notable members such as W. Ross Ashby.

The name Ratio was suggested by Albert Uttley, it being the Latin root meaning "computation or the faculty of mind which calculates, plans and reasons". He pointed out that it is also the root of rationarium, meaning a statistical account, and ratiocinatius, meaning argumentative. The use was probably inspired by an earlier suggestion by Donald Mackay of the 'MR club', from Machina ratiocinatrix, a term used by Norbert Wiener in the introduction to his then recently published book Cybernetics, or Control and Communication in the Animal and the Machine. Wiener used the term in reference to calculus ratiocinator, a calculating machine constructed by Leibniz.

The initial membership was W. Ross Ashby, Horace Barlow, John Bates, George Dawson, Thomas Gold, W. E. Hick, Victor Little, Donald MacKay, Turner McLardy, P. A. Merton, John Pringle, Harold Shipton, Donald Sholl, Eliot Slater, Albert Uttley, W. Grey Walter and John Hugh Westcott. Alan Turing joined after the first meeting with I. J. Good, Philip Woodward and William Rushton added soon after.

Giles Brindley attended several meetings as a guest. Warren McCulloch made presentations to the club twice, the first time at its inaugural meeting (a talk which the members found disappointing), and became a correspondent with and supporter of a number of its members. Others who attended at least one Ratio Club event as guests included Walter Pitts, Claude Shannon, J.Z. Young, C.H. Waddington, Peter Elias, J. C. R. Licklider, Oliver Selfridge, Benoît Mandelbrot, Colin Cherry and Anthony Oettinger. On one occasion I.J. Good brought along the then director of the USA's National Security Agency (presumably either Ralph Canine or John Samford given the dates).

Several members admired the work of psychologist and philosopher Kenneth Craik and considered him an important influence; according to Husbands and Holland "there is no doubt Craik would have been a leading member of the club" had he not died young in 1945.

The club has been considered the most influential cybernetics group in the UK, and many of its members went on to become prominent scientists.
