= David Cohen =

David Cohen may refer to:

== Academia ==
- David Cohen (historian) (1882–1967), Dutch historian, Holocaust survivor
- David Cohen (rabbi) (1887–1972), Rabbi, talmudist, philosopher, and kabbalist
- David Cohen (physicist) (born 1930), M.I.T. physicist
- David B. Cohen (psychologist) (1941–2004), American psychology professor
- David K. Cohen (1934–2020), American education theorist
- David Mark Cohen (1952–1997), playwriting professor at the University of Texas at Austin
- David William Cohen (born 1943), professor of history and anthropology
- David Harris Cohen, American neuroscientist, physiologist, and academic administrator

== Business ==
- David Cohen (entrepreneur) (born 1968), American entrepreneur
- David Cohen (died 2002), founder of John's Bargain Store
- David Oliver Cohen (born 1980), American writer, actor and entrepreneur

== Government and politics ==
- David Cohen (intelligence), New York City Police Department deputy commissioner, former CIA official
- David Cohen (politician) (1914–2005), American lawyer and Democratic politician in Philadelphia, PA
- David B. Cohen (mayor) (born 1947), American politician, mayor of Newton, Massachusetts
- David Jacob Cohen (died 1959), Indian politician
- David L. Cohen, American politician and US ambassador to Canada
- David S. Cohen (attorney) (born 1963), deputy director of the Central Intelligence Agency

== Journalism and writing ==
- David Cohen (art critic) (born 1963), founding editor of artcritical.com, art critic, art historian, curator, and publisher
- Dave Cohen (sportscaster) (born 1951), American sportscaster and actor
- Dave Cohen (writer), writer for television, radio and the Huffington Post
- David Elliot Cohen (born 1955), American editor and publisher
- David Mark Cohen (1952–1997), playwriting professor at the University of Texas at Austin
- David Steven Cohen (1958–2025), American TV writer (Strangers with Candy, Courage the Cowardly Dog, Living Single)
- David X. Cohen (born 1966), American TV writer and producer (The Simpsons, Futurama)

== Others ==
- Dave Cohen (American football) (born 1966), American college football coach
- Dave Cohen (musician) (born 1985), keyboardist
- David Bennett Cohen (born 1942), keyboardist and guitarist
- David Cohen (soldier) (1917–2020), member of the United States Army and school teacher
- David Cohen (diplomat), Israeli diplomat
- David Cohen (jockey) (born 1984), American jockey
- Jack the Ripper suspects § David Cohen
- Taika David Cohen (born 1975), known professionally as Taika Waititi, New Zealand filmmaker

== See also ==
- David Cohen Nassy (1612–1685), Portuguese converso and colonialist
