= Intermittency (disambiguation) =

Intermittency is a behavior of dynamical systems: regular alternation of phases of apparently periodic and chaotic dynamics.

Intermittent or intermittency may also refer to:

- Intermittent river or stream, the one that ceases to flow every year or at least twice every five years
- Intermittent energy source, renewable energy sources that are not dispatchable due to their fluctuating nature
- Intermittent fault, malfunction of a device or system that occurs at intervals, usually irregular
- Fluorescence intermittency, or blinking, is random switching between ON (bright) and OFF (dark) states
- Intermittent control, possibilities between the two extremes of continuous-time and discrete-time control: the control signal
