= John McCarthy =

John McCarthy may refer to:

== Government ==
- John George MacCarthy (1829–1892), member of parliament for Mallow constituency, 1874–1880
- John McCarthy (Irish politician) (1862–1893), member of parliament for the Mid Tipperary constituency, 1892–1893
- John H. McCarthy (1850–1908), U.S. representative from New York
- John McCarthy (Nebraska politician) (1857–1943), Nebraska Republican politician
- John F. McCarthy (1924–1981), California Republican senator
- John J. McCarthy (New Jersey politician) (1927–2001), New Jersey General Assembly member
- John V. McCarthy (c. 1932–1987), member of the Ohio House of Representatives
- John Thomas McCarthy (born 1939), U.S. ambassador
- John McCarthy (Australian diplomat) (born 1942), Australian ambassador to Vietnam, Mexico, Thailand, the United States, Indonesia, India and Japan
- John A. McCarthy (born 1947), Australian ambassador to the Holy See (2012–2016)
- John Keith McCarthy (1905–1976), Australian public servant in the Territory of Papua and New Guinea
- John McCarthy (Newfoundland politician), member of the House of Assembly

== Humanities and science ==
- John McCarthy (computer scientist) (1927–2011), American computer scientist
- John McCarthy (linguist) (born 1953), American phonologist
- John D. McCarthy (born 1940), American sociologist
- John McCarthy (mathematician) (born 1964), mathematician
- John F. McCarthy Jr., American scientist and engineer

== Sports ==
- John McCarthy (American football) (1916–1998), American football player
- John McCarthy (referee) (born 1962), mixed martial arts referee
- Johnny McCarthy (1934–2020), American basketball player and coach
- Johnny McCarthy (baseball) (1910–1973), American baseball player
- John McCarthy (Gaelic footballer) (born 1955), Dublin Gaelic footballer
- John McCarthy (Kerry Gaelic footballer), who played in the 1964 All-Ireland Senior Football Championship final
- John McCarthy (ice hockey) (born 1986), American ice hockey player and coach
- John McCarthy (discus thrower), Paralympic athlete from Ireland
- John McCarthy (soccer) (born 1992), American soccer player
- John McCarthy (Australian rules footballer, born 1967), player with Fitzroy and North Melbourne
- John McCarthy (Australian rules footballer, born 1989) (1989–2012), Port Adelaide and Collingwood player
- John McCarthy (sprinter) (born 1910), American sprinter, 1934 All-American for the USC Trojans track and field team

== Religious states ==
- John E. McCarthy (1930–2018), Roman Catholic bishop of the Diocese of Austin
- John McCarthy (Irish bishop) (1815–1893), bishop of Cloyne
- John McCarthy (Australian bishop), bishop of Sandhurst in Victoria, Australia
- John McCarthy (priest) (born 1938), dean of Clogher, 1989–1994
- John Joseph McCarthy (1896–1983), Irish-born bishop to Nairobi, Kenya

== Musicians ==
- John McCarthy (guitarist), guitarist
- John McCarthy (composer) (born 1961), Canadian composer
- John McCarthy (conductor) (1916–2009), conductor of choral music

== Others ==
- John McCarthy (journalist) (born 1956), British hostage and journalist
- John McCarthy Jr. (1912–1994), Oscar-nominated set decorator
- John Edward McCarthy (1911–1977), American radio personality
- John P. McCarthy (1884–1962), American director and screenwriter

== See also ==
- Jack McCarthy (disambiguation)
- Jon McCarthy (born 1970), English former professional footballer
- John McCarty (disambiguation)
