= Jack McCarthy =

Jack McCarthy may refer to:

- Jack McCarthy (Australian footballer) (1884–1939), Australian rules in Victoria
- Jack McCarthy (baseball) (1869–1948), Major League Baseball outfielder
- Jack McCarthy (cricketer) (1917–1998), Australian cricketer
- Jack McCarthy (football coach) (born c. 1911), Australian rules in South Australia
- Jack McCarthy (Irish footballer) (1898–1958), Irish soccer player during the 1920s and 1930s
- Jack McCarthy (television) (1914–1996), WPIX program host

== See also ==
- John McCarthy (disambiguation)
