= Mark Charney =

American playwright

Mark Charney is an American playwright, theatre educator, critic, and arts administrator currently serving as the Director of the School of Theatre and Dance at Texas Tech University. He is known for his work in theatre criticism, dramaturgy, and playwriting.

He has been involved with the Kennedy Center American College Theater Festival (KCACTF), serving as National and Regional Coordinator for the Institute for Theatre Journalism and Advocacy. Additionally, he spent 19 years as associate director of the National Critics Institute at the Eugene O’Neill Theater Center.

He was inducted into the College of Fellows of the American Theatre in 2024 and currently serves on their Board of Directors.

== Biography ==
Charney was born and raised in a mill town in South Carolina, where he grew up as part of the only Jewish family in a predominantly Southern Baptist community. He has described the theatre as a vital imaginative refuge from the cultural and spiritual constraints of his surroundings. His early interest in storytelling and critical inquiry guided him toward academic study in literature and the arts. He earned a B.A. in English from Clemson University, an M.A. in English from the University of New Orleans, and completed his Ph.D. in English at Tulane University in 1987.

== Academic career ==
During his academic career, Charney served as Chair of the Department of English and Director of Theatre for the Department of Performing Arts at Clemson University, where he earned teaching and service awards before retiring as professor emeritus in 2012.

That same year, he accepted the role of Director of the School of Theatre and Dance at Texas Tech University.

During his tenure, the School has partnered with institutions such as Bilkent University in Turkey, the Performing Arts Program in Hong Kong, and universities in Romania and South Korea. He also introduced experiential learning programs, including the WildWind Performance Lab, the Marfa Intensive, and the Tennessee Williams Institute.

He led the school's involvement in site-specific performance seasons throughout the Lubbock community. He recruited Pulitzer Prize-nominated playwright Rebecca Gilman and Pulitzer Prize winner Doug Wright as key faculty collaborators.

Charney has also served on the National Board of the National Association of Schools of Theatre (NAST) and was artistic director for the International Association of Schools of Southeast Asia for several years. He is currently Chair of Ethics for NAST. He has served as conference planner for playwriting with the Association for Theatre in Higher Education (ATHE), Secretary of the Southeastern Theatre Conference (SETC), and Co-Artistic Director of the WordBRIDGE Playwrights Laboratory, a developmental program for emerging playwrights. His scholarly work includes a substantial 61-page chapter titled “The Entertainment Marketplace from 2000–2014,” published in Screenwriting by Rutgers University Press, as well as a critical study on Southern author Barry Hannah.

== Works ==
His play The Power Behind the Palette won the David Mark Cohen National Playwriting Award and received a staged reading at the Association for Theatre in Higher Education (ATHE) in Los Angeles. Other original works include Shooting Blanks, which premiered at the Prague Fringe Festival in 2016, Incline/Decline, produced in Austin in 2014, and Dangling Modifiers, a reimagining of Antigone that debuted at the New Works Festival.

He has also co-authored several plays with colleague Cory Norman, including Empty Roads with Cars, which premiered at the Bilkent University Theatre Festival, and Public Domain: A Play with Footnotes, which debuted at the International Festival in Sharjah. Their recent play, If Christ Was Born in a Barn, Dyin’ in a Van Ain’t So Bad, about the life of Jack Kevorkian, has undergone workshops in Washington, DC, Marfa, and London, and is being considered for production in multiple London venues. The duo's other projects include Garage Door, Revenge of the Oompa Loompas, and their latest, Organ Recital was developed in the spring of 2025. Next up in January 2026 is a co-written play with Cory Norman: in honor of....

He is also the author of Barry Hannah (1991), the first full-length critical study of the Southern writer's work. In the book, Charney analyzes Hannah's evolving narrative style and thematic concerns, situating him within the tradition of Southern literature alongside figures like Faulkner and Welty.

=== Theatre criticism and dramaturgy ===
He introduced “dramaturgy” to all eight regions of Kennedy Center American College Theater Festival when he was chosen to serve on the Selection Committee in 2004. He also designed the Institute for Theatre Criticism and Advocacy, transitioning from its years as the National Critics Institute.

At the National Critics Institute at the O’Neill Theatre Center, he worked alongside Dan Sullivan and later Chris Jones to incorporate reviews of restaurants, dance performances, and interdisciplinary art, fostering a broader understanding of critique across media.

Charney has stated that he does not believe theatre criticism is in decline, despite the shrinking space in traditional newspapers. Instead, he sees the current moment as an opportunity, noting that platforms for expression have multiplied, even if the format has changed.

He believes in advocating for the arts while maintaining analytical integrity, and he mentors critics to appreciate and support the craft of theatre even in their critiques.

== Awards ==
- Induction into the College of Fellows of the American Theatre (2024)
- Kennedy Center Gold Medallion for Theatre Education
- Williams Kerns Award for Achievement in Performing Arts
- David Mark Cohen Award for Playwriting
- Phil and Mary Bradley Award for Mentoring in Creative Inquiry
