= Society for Neuroscience =

American professional society

- Abbreviation: SfN
- Founded: 1969
- Type: Learned society
- Purpose: Advancing the Understanding of the Brain and Nervous System
- Location(s): 1121 14th Street, NW Suite 1010; Washington, DC 20005
- Members: Nearly 37,000 (2017)
- Key people: Gina G. Turrigiano, President ('21-'22)
- Website: www.sfn.org

The Society for Neuroscience (SfN) is a professional society, headquartered in Washington, D.C., for basic scientists and physicians around the world whose research is focused on the study of the brain and nervous system. It is especially well known for its annual meeting, consistently one of the largest scientific conferences in the world.

== History ==
SfN was founded in 1969 by Ralph W. Gerard and, at nearly 35,000 members, has grown to be the largest neuroscience society in the world. The stated mission of the society is to:

1. Advance the understanding of the brain and the nervous system.
2. Provide professional development activities, information, and educational resources.
3. Promote public information and general education about science and neuroscience.
4. Inform legislators and other policy makers about the implications of research for public policy, societal benefit, and continued scientific progress.

== Annual meeting ==
The society holds an annual meeting that is attended by scientists and physicians from all around the world. The first annual meeting of the society was held in Washington, DC in October 1971, and it was attended by 1,396 scientists. Subsequent meetings have been held annually in a variety of cities throughout the US, with the exception of the 1988 meeting, which was held in Canada. In 2024, the meeting was held in Chicago, Illinois, with 22,359 attendees.

== Publishing ==
The Journal of Neuroscience, was launched in 1981 and has consistently been a multidisciplinary journal publishing papers on a broad range of topics of general interest to those working on the nervous-system. In addition, SfN publications offer breadth and depth into the rapidly developing field of neuroscience.

eNeuro, was launched in 2014, SfN's peer-reviewed open-access scientific journal, publishes high quality papers in all areas of neuroscience that increase the understanding of the nervous-system, including replication studies and negative results.

SfN's digital member magazine, Neuroscience Quarterly covers SfN news, programs, science, and events, and other neuroscience-related issues. Enhanced content includes videos, slideshows, and interactive elements.

Nexus is a digital newsletter, containing key dates and details for annual meeting attendees, the latest research for JNeurosci and eNeuro, and public education and advocacy initiatives.

== Presidents ==
The following people have been President of the Society:

- Ralph W. Gerard (Honorary president)
- Edward R. Perl (1969–1970)
- Vernon Mountcastle (1970–1971)
- Neal E. Miller (1971–1972)
- Walle Nauta (1972–1973)
- Theodore Holmes Bullock (1973–1974)
- Edward Evarts (1974–1975)
- Robert W. Doty (1975–1976)
- Floyd E. Bloom (1976–1977)
- W. Maxwell Cowan (1977–1978)
- Torsten Wiesel (1978–1979)
- Solomon H. Snyder (1979–1980)
- Eric Kandel (1980–1981)
- David H. Cohen (1981–1982)
- Dominick P. Purpura (1982–1983)
- Gerald D. Fischbach (1983–1984)
- William D. Willis Jr. (1984–1985)
- Bernice Grafstein (1985–1986)
- Mortimer Mishkin (1986–1987)
- Albert Aguayo (1987–1988)
- David H. Hubel (1988–1989)
- Patricia Goldman-Rakic (1989–1990)
- Robert H. Wurtz (1990–1991)
- Joseph T. Coyle (1991–1992)
- Ira B. Black (1992–1993)
- Larry R. Squire (1993–1994)
- Carla J. Shatz (1994–1995)
- Pasko Rakic (1995–1996)
- Bruce McEwen (1996–1997)
- Lorne Mendell (1997–1998)
- Edward G. Jones (1998–1999)
- Dennis Choi (1999–2000)
- Donald L. Price (2000–2001)
- Fred Gage (2001–2002)
- Huda Akil (2002–2003)
- Anne B. Young (2003–2004)
- Carol A. Barnes (2004–2005)
- Stephen F. Heinemann (2005–2006)
- David C. Van Essen (2006–2007)
- Eve Marder (2007–2008)
- Thomas J. Carew (2008–2009)
- Mickey Goldberg (2009–2010)
- Susan Amara (2010–2011)
- Moses Chao (2011–2012)
- Larry W. Swanson (2012–2013)
- Carol A. Mason (2013–2014)
- Steven Hyman (2014–2015)
- Hollis Cline (2015–2016)
- Eric Nestler (2016–2017)
- Richard L. Huganir (2017–2018)
- Diane Lipscombe (2018–2019)
- Barry J. Everitt (2019–2021)
- Gina G. Turrigiano (2021–2022)
- Oswald Steward (2022–2023)
- Marina Picciotto (2023–2024)
- John Morrison (2024–2025)

== Awards ==
SfN offers the following awards, fellowships, and honors:

- Award for Education in Neuroscience
- Bernice Grafstein Award for Outstanding Accomplishments in Mentoring
- Chapter of the Year Award
- CNS Meeting Awards
- Donald B. Lindsley Prize in Behavioral Neuroscience
- FENS Forum Awards
- IBRO World Congress Awards
- Jacob P. Waletzky Award
- Janett Rosenberg Trubatch Career Development Award
- Jennifer N. Bourne Prize in Neuronal and Synaptic Structure and Function
- JNS Meeting Travel Awards
- Julius Axelrod Prize
- Louise Hanson Marshall Special Recognition Award
- Mika Salpeter Lifetime Achievement Award
- Nemko Prize in Cellular or Molecular Neuroscience
- Neuroscience Scholars Program
- Next Generation Award
- Patricia Goldman-Rakic Hall of Honor
- Peter Seeburg Integrative Neuroscience Prize
- Peter and Patricia Gruber International Research Award
- Ralph W. Gerard Prize in Neuroscience
- Science Educator Award
- Swartz Prize for Theoretical and Computational Neuroscience
- Tianqiao and Chrissy Chen Young Investigator Award
- Trainee Professional Development Awards
