= Lorne Mendell =

Professor of neuorbiology

Lorne M. Mendell
- Citizenship: United States
- Education: B.S. Mathematics; B.S. Physics; Ph.D. Neurophysiology
- Alma mater: McGill University; Massachusetts Institute of Technology
- Known for: Neurotophins and neuroplasticity
- Spouse(s): Nancy Mendell, Ph.D.
- Children: 2
- Scientific career
- Fields: Neurobiology; Neurophysiology; Spinal Cord Research
- Workplaces: Duke University; Stony Brook University

Lorne Mendell is a neurobiologist currently employed as a distinguished professor in the department of neurobiology and behavior at Stony Brook University in New York. His research focuses primarily on neurotrophins in neonatal and adult mammals, and on the neuroplasticity of the mammalian spinal cord. His research interests lie in other areas including pain, nerve wind-up, and specifically the neurotrophin NT-3. He has contributed to the growing pool of knowledge of axonal development and regeneration of immature and mature neurons. He has been a part of the search for novel treatments for spinal cord injuries and continues to study neurotrophins to determine their effects on neuronal plasticity. He served a term as president of the Society of Neuroscience during 1997–1998.

== Personal life and education ==
Mendell graduated from McGill University in 1961 with a Bachelor of Science in both mathematics and physics. He earned his Ph.D. in neurophysiology from the Massachusetts Institute of Technology in 1965. He is married to Nancy Mendell, a professor emerita in the department of applied mathematics and statistics at Stony Brook University. They have a son and a daughter.

== Career ==
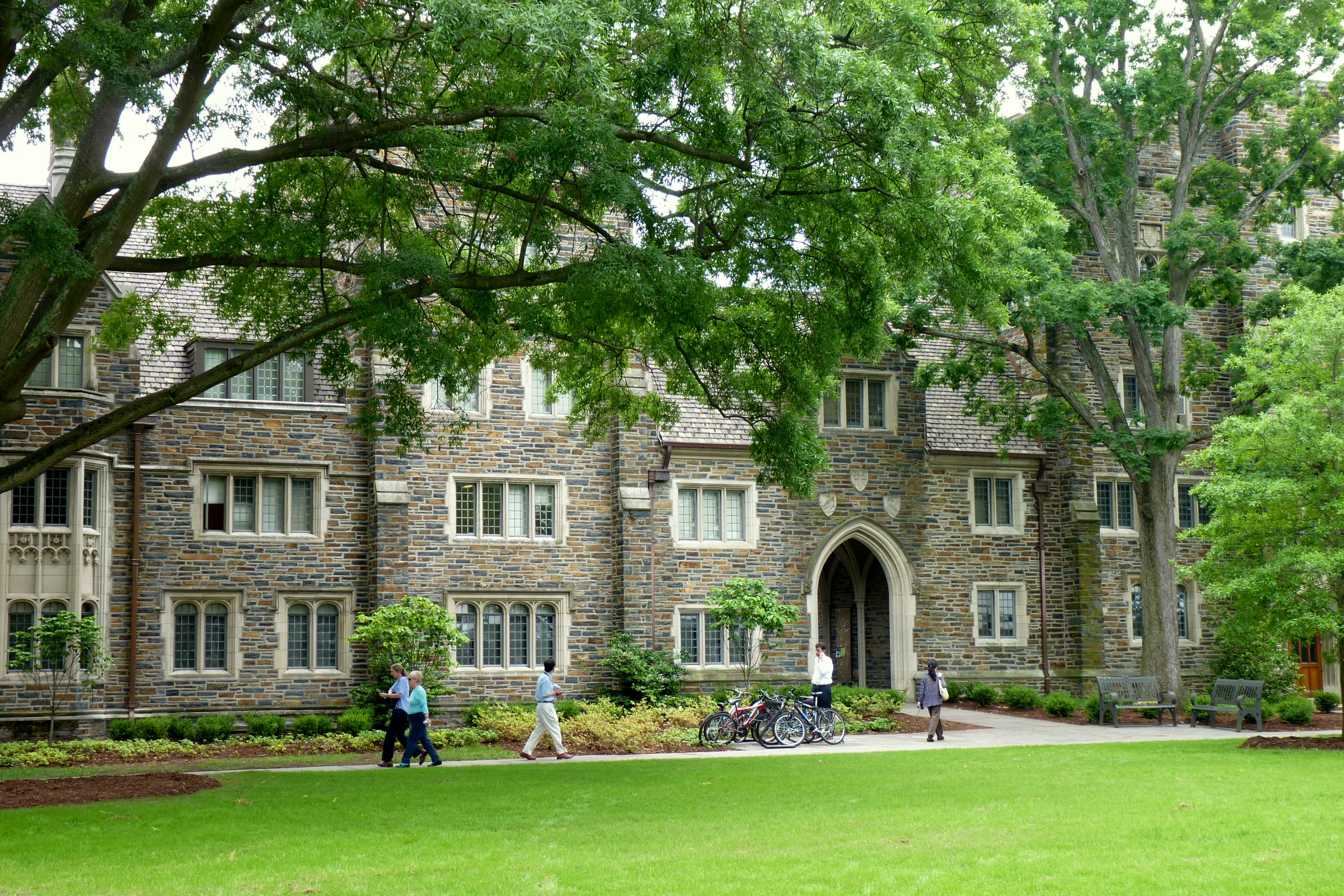
Duke University

Shortly after earning his Ph.D., Mendell became a faculty member at Duke University Medical Center in 1968. He remained at Duke until 1980 when he joined the faculty at Stony Brook University. Since then, Mendell has held numerous positions in a number of associations and organizations. He has also received many honors and awards throughout his career as a neurobiologist.

== Research ==
Mendell's research within neurotrophins has focused specifically on nerve growth factors (NGF) and their role that they play within inflammatory pain. Within this, there was also a focus in brain-derived neurotrophic factor (BDNF) and their sensitizing effect on specific synaptic transmission between nociceptors and their target. In his recent labs, he has been studying the contributions of a third neurotrophin (NT-3) and the effects of altering the synapses involved in transmission between stretch receptors and motor neurons. Mendell's research on neuronal plasticity is specifically focused on the mammalian spinal cord. He has combined some of his research from NT-3 to help show how neurotrophins can help alter the function of both damaged and undamaged neurons.

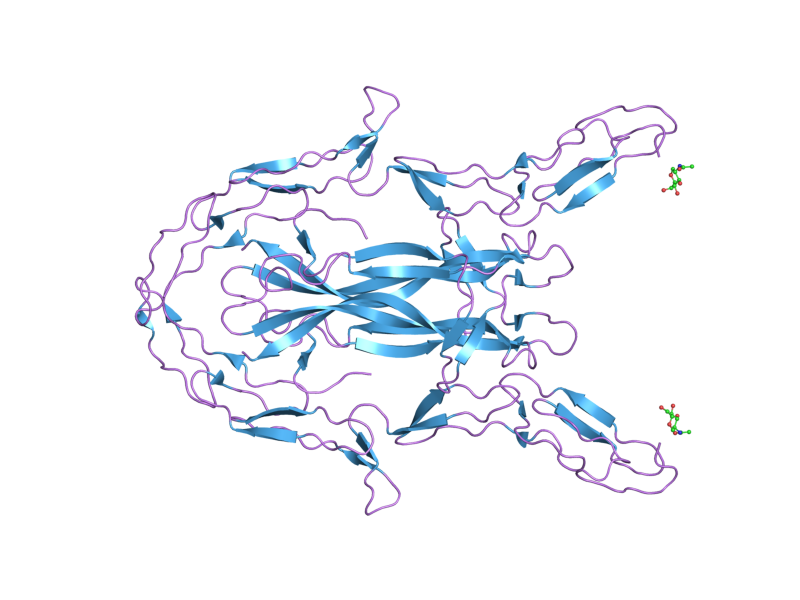
This is an example of a neurotrophin, 3BUK.

Much of the work Mendell has done with both neurotrophin and neuronal plasticity has some overlap into the realm of pain, and what their roles are in both reducing and relieving pain. For example, Mendell has conducted research which has shown the relationship between nerve growth factors and inflammatory pain. Mendell discovered the property of windup pain in the spinal cord. Windup is the property of C-fibres in the peripheral nerves of the spinal cord that when stimulated at repetitious low frequencies there will be a gradual accumulation in the amplitude of response.

Mendell has been interested in the role neurotrophins play in nervous plasticity since at least the mid-1990s. At the time, neurotrophins were understood to be significant factors in neuronal development and differentiation in the central and peripheral nervous system, however; scientists were still exploring the specific functions of individual neurotrophins. Subsequent findings suggested that neurotrophins have effects on both damaged and undamaged neurons. As such, neurotrophins are a major facet of spinal cord injury research. Mendell's research on neurotrophins has evolved synchronously with the understanding of neurotrophins. In more recent times, Mendell's research has been focused partly on spinal cord injury and the use of neurotrophins as a possible treatment.

Hyperalgesia, increase of sensitivity to a stimulus, was found by Mendell to be influenced by the introduction of nerve growth factor (NGF). It functions by interactions with sensory nociceptive neurons. Mendell was able to investigate how rodents and mammals sensitivity to thermal and mechanical stimulus was increased through exposure to NGF. NGF was shown by Mendell to also play a role in the development of young mammals. Mature animals, he showed, that NGF had a possible role in the linkage of hyperalgesia and inflammation.

== Major works and contributions ==
In 1965, Mendell's doctoral dissertation was published in the academic journal Nature. His dissertation focused on neuronal fibers in the spinal cord and their effect on other fibers, specifically how C fibers in the dorsal horn of the spinal cord affect A fibers. Mendell's research did not support the conclusion that the activation of C fibers did not have an effect on the A fibers in question. Mendell contributed to a 2016 publication that focused on the relationship between a protein called CD2AP and the plasticity of neurons. It is known that the growth of an axon of a neuron helps with both the adaptive and maladaptive plasticity within the nervous system. Therefore, if an axon becomes injured, or cannot function to its best ability, the consequences can be in the form of neurologic disease. The protein CD2AP in this study was looked at in depth, which is responsible for coordinating axon outgrowth. Mendell and his team were able to observe that CD2AP is amplified within dorsal root ganglions (DRGs) during axonal sprouting, but decreases in quantity during axonal regeneration. Based on these findings, it is still undetermined what the exact relationship between the control of the regeneration of previously damaged axons and the additional development of non-damaged axons is.

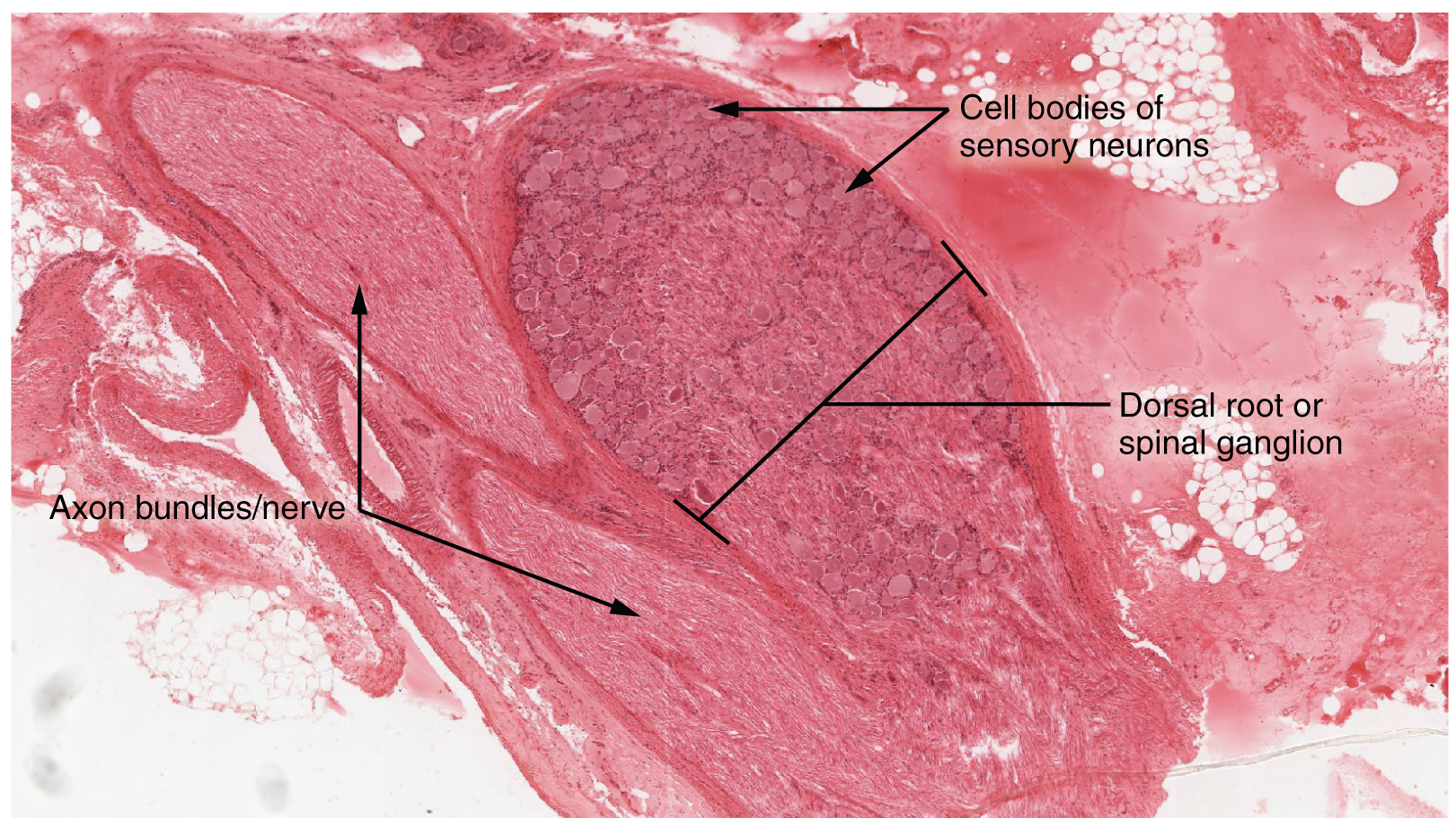
Illustration of what a dorsal root ganglion might look like.

Mendell was also involved in a 2011 study, that explored the mechanisms involved in the relationship between neuronal growth factors (NGF) and pain. The NGF-TrkA axis, can facilitate the development of many different types of long-term acute and chronic pain. Specific mutations in NGF or TrkA genes can lead to a decrease in the sensitivity to pain. This study suggested an important relationship between the pain and the number of NGF-responsive (TrkA-positive) nociceptors connected to the tissue where the pain is coming from. This relationship has important implications in the treatment of chronic pain. With this relationship in mind, the pain can be targeted by more specific treatment. Mendell has also put forth research about the increased possibility of promoting spinal cord repair through a combination of several different treatments. The mechanisms involved in this are due to the additive effects when several different neurotrophins and proteins are combined, including chondroitinase ABC, NT3, and enhanced levels of NR2D. These together allow for either the synthesis or strengthening of spinal circuits, as well as slight recovery of function for those that have been damaged.

=== Positions held ===
- Chair of the Department of Neurobiology and Behavior, Stony Brook University, 1986-2006
- Journal of Neurophysiology editor-in-chief, 1983-1989
- Editorial Board member for the Journal of Neurophysiology, current
- Editorial Board member for the Journal of Neuroscience, 1983-1989
- Council member for the Society for Neuroscience, 1986-1990
- President of the Association of Neuroscience Departments and Programs, 1991-1992
- Treasurer of the Society for Neuroscience, 1996-1997
- President of the Society for Neuroscience, 1997-1998
- Board of Directors for the Craig Neilsen Foundation, 2009
- Chairman for the Spinal Cord Injury Research Board of the State of New York, 2013
- Senior Editor for Neuroplasticity for the Oxford University Press Research Encyclopedia in Neuroscience, 2015

=== Honors and awards ===
- Distinguished professor of Neurobiology and Behavior at Stony Brook University
- Member of the London (UK) Pain Consortium Advisory Board, 2009-2014
- Gave the History of Neuroscience plenary lecture (“The Emergence of Contemporary Pain Neuroscience”) during the Annual Meeting of the Society for Neuroscience, 2012
- Member of the International Science Advisory Council of Brain Canada, 2014
- Named a fellow for the American Physiological Society Inaugural Class, 2015
