= American College Theatre Festival =

American national theater program

The American College Theatre Festival (formerly the Kennedy Center American College Theatre Festival) is a national theater program dedicated to the improvement of collegiate theater in the United States. Focused on the celebration of diverse and exciting theater, the organization involves students from more than 600 colleges and universities throughout the United States.

== Overview ==
Started in the 1960s by Roger L. Stevens, the Kennedy Center's founding chairman, the American College Theatre Festival is a national theater program involving 18,000 students from colleges and universities in the United States that aims to help improve the quality of college theater in the United States. The organization has grown into a network of more than 600 academic institutions throughout the country, where theater departments and student artists showcase their work and receive outside assessment. Since its establishment in 1969, the American College Theatre Festival has reached more than 16 million theatergoing students and teachers nationwide.

While the culmination of the organization's year is the national festival, the majority of students involved in the program compete in one of eight regional competitions. The national festival is not intended to be a competition, but there are a number of scholarships and awards presented throughout the week, including the Irene Ryan Acting Scholarships. Other competitions include playwriting, directing, set, costume, lighting and sound design, and the Eugene O'Neill Theater Center critic's institute and dramaturgy awards, including the David Mark Cohen National Playwriting Award.

For 58 years the national festival was held in Washington, D.C. at the Kennedy Center, but in 2025, after President Trump dismissed the performing arts center's board of directors, appointing new directors aligned with his agenda for it, and moved to add his name to the center, the American College Theatre Festival announced that it has ended its partnership with the Kennedy Center, stating: "Due to ... decisions that do not align with our organization’s values, the National Committee ... has voted to suspend our affiliation with the Kennedy Center."

== Regions ==
The American College Theatre Festival has eight regionals throughout the United States divided as follows:

Outstanding Performance by an Actress
Region	States
Region I	Connecticut; Massachusetts; Rhode Island; Vermont; New Hampshire; Maine
Region II	Delaware; District of Columbia; Maryland; New Jersey; New York; Pennsylvania; New York is split between Regions 1 & 2.
Region III	Illinois; Wisconsin; Michigan; Ohio; Indiana
Region IV	Virginia; West Virginia; Kentucky; Tennessee; North Carolina; South Carolina; Georgia; Mississippi; Alabama; Florida; Puerto Rico; US Virgin Islands
Region V	Iowa; Kansas; Minnesota; Missouri; Nebraska; North Dakota; South Dakota
Region VI	Oklahoma; New Mexico; Texas; Arkansas; Louisiana
Region VII	Washington; Oregon; Montana; Idaho; Wyoming; Colorado; Alaska
Region VIII	California; Nevada; Utah; Arizona; Hawaii; California is split between Regions 7 & 8.

== National committee personnel ==
- Gregg Henry - Co-Manager, Artistic Director
- Susan Shaffer - Co-Manager, Administration
- Mark Kuntz - National Chair
- Dr. Harry Parker - National Vice-Chair
- Karen Anselm - Member at Large
- Mark Charney - National Coordinator for the Critic's Institute
- Michael Dempsey - National Theatrical Design Chair
- Catherine Norgren - ATHE Liaison
- John Uthoff - USITT Representative
- Kate Snodgrass - National Chair of Michael Kanin New Plays Program
- Roger Hall - National Vice Chair of NPP
- Gary Garrison - NPP Member at Large

== Production awards ==
The productions below have been recognized for their outstanding achievement.

Outstanding Production of a Play

- 2014 - Pentecost by David Edgar, Middlebury College
- 2013 - Vincent In Brixton by Nicholas Wright, Utah Valley University
- 2012 - Six Characters adapted from Luigi Pirandello's Six Characters in Search of an Author, Iowa State University.

Outstanding Production of a Musical

- 2014 - Next to Normal book and lyrics by Brian Yorkey and music by Tom Kitt, Utah Valley University
- 2013 - Godspell, music and lyrics by Stephen Schwartz, book by John-Michael Tebelak, California State University, Fullerton
- 2012 - Flipside: The Patti Page Story by Greg White, University of Central Oklahoma.

Outstanding Production of a New Work

- 2014 - Decision Height by Meredith Levy, Hollins University
- 2013 - Platero y Yo by Juan Ramon Jimenez, adapted for the stage by Maria Eugenia Mercado and Julia Thompson, University of Puerto Rico
- 2012 - The Circus in Winter, music and lyrics by Ben Clark, book by the students of the Virginia B. Ball Center for Creative Inquiry,

inspired by the novel by Cathy Day, Ball State University.

Outstanding Production of a Devised Work

- 2014 - Pool '63 by Philip Valle and members of the Company, Cuesta College
- 2013 - Dromnium, University of Arkansas, Fort Smith
- 2012 - Re-membering Antigone, Long Island University, C.W. Post Campus.

Outstanding Production of a Modern Classic

- 2013 - Mother Courage, Illinois State University
- 2012 - Re-membering Antigone, Long Island University, C.W. Post Campus.

== Directing awards ==
The individuals below have been recognized for their direction of plays, musicals, classic and devised works, and new plays and musicals.

Outstanding Career Achievement in Directing

- 2012 - John David Lutz, Master Harold and the Boys, University of Evansville.

This production marked John David Lutz's 24th production showcased at Regional Festivals since 1971. Six of these productions were additionally showcased at the National Festival at the Kennedy Center. In 2007, by special invitation, his University of Evansville production of Shakespeare's The Comedy of Errors was one of the Kennedy Center's contributions to the "Shakespeare in Washington" celebration.

Outstanding Director of a Play

- 2014 - Richard Romagnoli and Cheryl Faraone for Pentecost, Middlebury College
- 2013 - Christopher Clark for Vincent In Brixton by Nicholas Wright, Utah Valley University
- 2012 - Matt Foss for Six Characters, adapted from Luigi Pirandello, Iowa State University.

Outstanding Director of a Classic

- 2012 - Maria Porter for Re-membering Antigone, Long Island University, C.W. Post Campus.

Outstanding Director of a Musical

- 2014 - David Tinney, Next to Normal, Utah Valley University
- 2013 - Jim Taulli and Craig Tyrl for Godspell, California State University, Fullerton.
- 2012 - Greg White for Flipside: The Patti Page Story, University of Central Oklahoma.

Outstanding Lead Deviser/Director of a Devised Work

- 2014 - Bree Valle, Pool '63, Cuesta College
- 2013 - Leslie Ferreira, Tina Kronis and Richard Alger, Untitled Warhol Project, Los Angeles City College, Theatre Academy.
- 2012 - Rich Brown, Us, Western Washington University.

Outstanding Director of a New Work

- 2014 - Peter Sampieri for Kafka in Tel Aviv, Salem State University
- 2013 - Maria Eugenia Mercado and Julia Thompson for Platero y Yo by Juan Ramón Jiménez, University of Puerto Rico.
- 2012 - Beth Turcotte for The Circus in Winter, music and lyrics by Ben Clark, book by the students of the Virginia B. Ball Center for Creative Inquiry,

inspired by the novel by Cathy Day, Ball State University.

== Acting awards ==
Outstanding Performance by an Actress
Year	Actress	Role - Production	College
2014	Jacquelyne Jones	as Diana in Next to Normal	Utah Valley University
2014	Rachel Staton	Ensemble in The Laramie Project	University of Mississippi
2013	Abby Vombrack	as Anna Fierling in Mother Courage	Illinois State University
2013	Elizabeth Golden	as Ursula in Vincent In Brixton	Utah Valley University
2012	Rene Michelle Aranda	as Willy the Space Freak in The Unseen Hand	Los Angeles City College, Theatre Academy
2012	Haley Jane Pierce	as Clara Ann Fowler in Flipside: The Patti Page Story	University of Central Oklahoma

Outstanding Performance by an Actor
Year	Actor	Role - Production	College
2014	James Weschler	as Kafka in Kafka in Tel Aviv	Salem State University
2013	Nathan Burke	Ensemble in The Laramie Project	University of Mississippi
2013	Jonathan Amaro	as Platero in Platero y Yo	University of Puerto Rico
2012	John Stewart	as Frederick Douglass/Jim in Splittin' the Raft	Kennesaw State University
2012	Dylan Frederick	as Hallie in Master Harold and the Boys	University of Evansville

== Choreography awards ==
Outstanding Choreography or Movement Direction

- 2014 - Tori Lee Averett for The Single Girl's Guide, Troy University.
- 2013 - Bob Stevenson with Ian Miller, Phil Whiteaker, Aron Long, Laura Wineland, Stuart Campbell, Ashley Behm, and Joseph Rodriguez-Barberá for Dromnium, University of Arkansas, Fort Smith
- 2012 - Skye Edwards for Gone Missing, Hope College.

== Design awards ==
Outstanding Scenic Design

- 2014 - Mark Evancho, Pentecost, Middlebury College
- 2013 - Stephen Purdy, Vincent In Brixton, Utah Valley University
- 2013 - Shannon Meyer, Ghost Bike, Carthage College.
- 2012 - Christopher and Justin Swader, The Circus in Winter, Ball State University.

Outstanding Sound Design

- 2013 - L.J. Luthringer, Dromnium, University of Arkansas, Fort Smith.
- 2012 - Sun Hee Kil, Flipside: The Patti Page Story, University of Central Oklahoma.

Outstanding Costume Design

- 2014 - Elisa Bierschenk, The Single Girl's Guide, Troy University
- 2013 - JenNessa Law, Vincent In Brixton, Utah Valley University
- 2012 - Caroline Spitzer, The House of the Spirits, Florida International University.

Outstanding Lighting Design

- 2014 - Michael Gray, Next to Normal, Utah Valley University
- 2014 - Raquel Davis, Three Sisters, Boise State University
- 2013 - Hannah Yaeger, Dromnium, University of Arkansas, Fort Smith.
- 2012 - Matt Meldrem, Six Characters, Iowa State University.

== Other awards ==
Outstanding Performance by a Guest Artist

- 2012 - Lindsie Van Winkle as Patti in Flipside: The Patti Page Story, University of Central Oklahoma

Outstanding Achievement in Composition

- 2013 - Zack Powell for Mother Courage, Illinois State University

Outstanding Performance and Production Ensembles

- 2013 - Platero y Yo, University of Puerto Rico
- 2013 - Dromnium, University of Arkansas, Fort Smith

== Irene Ryan Scholarship ==
A list of the Irene Ryan Scholarship winners, the partners that assisted their wins, and the colleges they represented, from 1972 to 2013:

- 2013 - Oya Bangura assisted by Bryan Nee, Suffolk County Community College & Ethan Leaverton assisted by Cameron Miller-DeSart, University of Nevada
- 2012 - Kevin Percivall assisted by Laurel Sein, University of Oklahoma & James Udom assisted by Brian Smick, Diablo Valley College
- 2011 - Clayton Joyner assisted by Zachary Powell, Illinois State University & Daniel Molina assisted by Kelly Rogers, Savannah College of Art and Design
- 2010 - Whitney Morgan Cox assisted by John Dodart, Dixie State University, Utah & Paul Stuart assisted by Colin Ryan, University of Oklahoma
- 2009 - Adam Navarro assisted by Courtney Howe, California State University & Meredith Hinckely assisted by Paul Collins California State University
- 2008 - Ari Frenkel assisted by Tim Hackney, Montclair State University & Joe Gillette assisted by Peter Weisman, California State University
- 2007 - Courtney Moors assisted by Michael Cox, University of Central Florida & Chris Crawford assisted by Jenna Kirk, University of Arkansas
- 2006 - Rory Lipede assisted by Adam Flores, Fontbonne University & Michael Swickard assisted by Margaret-Ellen Jenkins, University of Central Florida
- 2005 - Amanda Folena, Purdue University & Stephen Laferriere, Salem State College
- 2004 - Christopher Grant, University of Evansville & Jason Roth, University of Maryland
- 2003 - Ruby DesJardins, Suffolk University & Letitia James, Virginia Commonwealth University
- 2002 - Kelly Bartlett, Iowa State University & Sarah Stockton, University of Portland
- 2001 - Nancy McNulty, Salem State University & Jason Buuck, California State University
- 2000 - Nisi Sturgis, University of Central Arkansas & Ben Steinfeld, Brown University
- 1999 - Megan Dillingham, University of Kansas, Lawrence & Rian Jairell, University of Wyoming
- 1998 - Hattie Davis, Emporia State University, Kansas & Christopher Ross, University of Nebraska-Omaha
- 1997 - Stephanie Breinholt, Brigham Young University & Esau Pritchett, Oakland University
- 1996 - Mireille Enos, Brigham Young University & Gabriel Fazio, Suffolk Community College
- 1995 - Gretchen Cleevely, Miami University of Ohio & Aidan Sullivan, Middlebury College
- 1994 - Lara Jo Hightower, University of Arkansas, Fayetteville & Kevin P. Rahm, Brigham Young University
- 1993 - Maria Santucci, Kansas State University, Manhattan & David Bryan Woodside, University of Iowa
- 1992 - Max Baker, Washington State University, Pullman & Thomas Silcott, Salem State University
- 1991 - Scott Claflin, Brigham Young University & Heather K. Wilson, University of South Dakota
- 1990 - Kelly Eviston, Northern Kentucky University & Jeff Lieber, University of Illinois
- 1989 - Blondale Funderburk, South Carolina State College & Kelly Bertenshaw, University of Minnesota
- 1988 - Judith Hawking, California Institute of the Arts & Elaine Gallagher, Linfield College
- 1987 - Melodie Garrett, North Carolina A&T & Brett Rickaby, University of Minnesota
- 1986 - Kevin Hardesty, University of Kentucky & Tim Gregory, Otterbein College
- 1985 - David Studwell, Purdue University & Brad Moniz, California State University
- 1984 - Julia Campbell, Webster College & Gerry McIntyre, Montclair State College
- 1983 - Don Reilly, College of William & Mary & Jodi Ewen, University of Evansville
- 1982 - Ron Marasco, Fordham University & Christina Stinson, University of Evansville
- 1981 - Andrea Huber, Illinois Wesleyan University & Melinda McCrary, Webster College
- 1980 - Mark Tymchyshyn, Wayne State University & Julia Glander, University of Iowa
- 1979 - Larry LoVerde, Rhode Island College & Sharon Rolf, University of Evansville
- 1978 - Saundra Lane Daniel, University of Montevallo & Jeff J. Redford, Cerritos College
- 1977 - Lynn Topping, Indiana State University & Albert Rodriquez, University of New Mexico
- 1976 - Rebecca J. Guy, University of Evansville & Kathy Monteleone, Park College
- 1975 - John M. Doyle, University of Florida & Dan Butler, Indiana University
- 1974 - Anne Sward, University of Miami & Sheryl L. Ralph, Douglass College, Rutgers University
- 1973 - Kathleen Couser, North Texas State University & Jeffrey Ware, University of Maryland
- 1972 - Joyce D. Hanley, Hofstra University & Michael Biers, United States International University
