= Tom Gilmartin (politician) =

American politician

Member of the Ohio House of Representatives from the 53rd district
- In office January 3, 1973-December 31, 1986
- Preceded by: John V. McCarthy
- Succeeded by: Bob Hagan
- In office January 3, 1967-December 31, 1968
- Preceded by: None (First)
- Succeeded by: John V. McCarthy

Personal details
- Born: December 10, 1924 Youngstown, Ohio, United States
- Died: January 18, 2012 (aged 87) Austintown, Ohio, United States
- Party: Democratic

Thomas P. Gilmartin was a former member of the Ohio House of Representatives.
