= Carol Mason =

Professor of Pathology and Cell Biology

- Born: Carol Ann Mason
- Education: Chatham University (BS); University of California, Berkeley (PhD)
- Awards: Member of the National Academy of Sciences (2018)
- Scientific career
- Workplaces: Columbia University; New York University
- Thesis: Studies on arthropod neurons: I. Axonal transport in a crayfish neuron. II. Visualization of neurosecretory pathways in the locust (1973)
- Website: www.pathology.columbia.edu/profile/carol-mason-phd

Carol Ann Mason is a Professor of Pathology and Cell Biology at Columbia University in the Mortimer B. Zuckerman Mind Brain Behavior Institute. She studies axon guidance in visual pathways in an effort to restore vision to the blind. Her research focuses on the retinal ganglion cell. She was elected a member of the National Academy of Sciences in 2018.

== Early life and education ==
Mason earned her bachelor's degree at Chatham University and graduated in 1967. Mason earned her doctorate in invertebrate zoology and endocrinology at University of California, Berkeley. She was a member of Phi Beta Kappa. In 1967 she was awarded a Woodrow Wilson Foundation Fellowship.

== Research and career ==
Mason was a postdoctoral fellow at the University of Wisconsin–Madison and the University of Chicago. She worked with Ray Guillery on the cellular anatomy of the visual systems of cats. She joined the New York University School of Medicine in 1980.

Mason was appointed to the faculty at Columbia University in 1987. She co-directs the Neurobiology and Behaviour program and the National Institutes of Health Vision Sciences training program. Mason studies the role of transcriptional regulators and guidance mechanisms in the mammalian visual system. In particular, she studies the retinal ganglion cell, which connects the eye to the thalamus, which act as sensory relay stations. Half of the retinal ganglion cells send information to one side of the thalamus, whereas the other half send information to the other side. Mason studies how these axons know whether or not to cross over the optical chiasm. To understand how this happens, Mason used a camera lucida to trace out the axons at the root of retinal ganglion cells. Mason focussed on the tips of the axons, and found that most extend across the same side of their brains as where they start. Mason identified that when one type of retinal ganglion cell reaches this chiasm, molecules bind to receptors that prevent them from crossing over, whereas the other type does not.

Mason makes studies of mutated genes in mice. She also applies chemical labels to the retinal ganglion cells to monitor them in the brain. She uses high resolution imaging to create three-dimensional rendering of the axons. She is applying her understanding to the albino visual system, where there is a lack of pigment that can lead to visual impairments. Visual impairments occur due to misrouting of retinal fibres at the optical chiasm, connecting them to contralateral not ipsilateral targets. She is investigating how the melanogenic pathway from the retinal pigment epithelium impacts retinal patterning. She is studying how gene activity can transform stem cells into retinal ganglion cells which could be used for restoring vision.

Mason serves as an editor of the journals eLife, Current Opinion in Neurology and Neural Development. As President of the Society for Neuroscience, Mason called for action on improving diversity within the neuroscience community.

== Awards and honours ==
- 2006 Fellow of the American Association for the Advancement of Science
- 2013 President of the Society for Neuroscience
- 2014 Senior Fellow of the Simons Foundation
- 2016 António Champalimaud Foundation Champalimaud Vision Award
- 2017 Society for Neuroscience Mika Salpeter Lifetime Achievement Award
- 2018 Elected to the National Academy of Sciences
