= Ballistic movement =

Type of muscle contraction

Ballistic movement can be defined as muscle contractions that exhibit maximum velocities and accelerations over a very short period of time. They exhibit high firing rates, high force production, and very brief contraction times.

== Physiology ==
=== Muscle contraction ===
The muscle contraction of a ballistic muscle movement can exhibit a muscle coactivation of concurrent agonist and antagonist muscles or the characteristic triphasic agonist/antagonist/agonist muscle activation. Electromyography (EMG) recordings of demonstrate the triphasic muscle activation begins with a brief agonist motor unit activation signal with firing rates of 60 to 120 Hz that may last for 100ms and occurs 50 to 100ms before movement begins. The firing rates of ballistic movements are much higher than that of slow ramp movements (5–15 Hz). The brief agonist muscle contraction is thus followed by antagonist muscle unit activation. The degree of antagonist muscle unit activation is dependent on the task at hand unlike the first agonist muscle activation which is independent to environmental stimuli. The function of the antagonist muscle contraction is believed to control the amplitude and timing of ballistic movements. Antagonist muscle contraction may serve to prevent injury to joints by preventing the limb from overextending itself and also function to control the distance and time the limb is being moved. Experiments involving ballistic movement of small amplitudes show a marked increase in antagonist muscle activation and experiments where distance moved is not controlled antagonist muscle activation was decreased or absent. The second agonist muscle activation is suggested to terminate the negative acceleration of the antagonist muscle contraction and thus the ballistic movement.

=== Power and energetics ===
==== Elastic storage of energy ====
Ballistic movements are often powered through elastic energy storage and subsequent recovery mechanisms. The power required to produce the extremely rapid velocities of ballistic movements is made possible through muscle work being stored in elastic elements (such as tendons, aponeuroses, or even muscle). Muscle work is applied to these elastic elements over a relatively slow period of time, and is released very rapidly. Higher power output is produced because the energy is released in a much shorter amount of time than it is stored. In this sense the power of the muscles is actually amplified. When energy is produced by muscle contraction, stored in a tendon, then released to increase mechanical energy of the body (or body segment), muscle power is amplified. The term power ‘amplification’ may be deceptive. In animals, elastic mechanisms never add energy to the system; they amplify power in the sense that the energy is released more rapidly than it is stored.

==== Possible benefits ====
Ballistic systems are capable of power outputs that are significantly greater than that of the muscles associated with the actual movement. One prime example of this is tongue projection in salamanders. This decoupling of muscle work from body/limb work is a major benefit of elastic energy storage mechanisms. Another benefit resulting from this decoupling is decreased thermal dependence of ballistic movement. Deban and Lappin analyzed the prey capture behavior of toads (Bufo terrestris), which involves two types of movement: elastically powered, ballistic movement (mouth opening and tongue projection) and muscle-powered movement (tongue retraction and mouth closing). The toad feeding was observed across a range of temperatures (11–35 °C), and the kinematic, dynamic, and electromyographic variables were measured and analyzed. Over the 11–35 °C temperature range, the ballistic movements had Q_{10} values very close to 1 (Q_{10} = 0.99–1.25), signifying thermal independence and supporting the main hypothesis. The muscle-powered movements had a higher temperature coefficient (Q_{10} = 1.77–2.26), signifying thermal dependence.

Another example of a thermally independent ballistic movement is tongue projection in chameleons. It was discovered that veiled chameleons (Chamaeleo calyptratus) were able to perform this high-performance tongue projection, and successful prey capture, across a wide range of temperatures (15 °C–35 °C). Anderson and Deban also found a contrast between thermal dependence of tongue projection and retraction (which is not elastically-powered). This further supports the hypothesis that the elastic recoil mechanism is responsible for the decreased thermal dependence of ballistic tongue projection.

== Examples ==
=== Trap-jaw ants ===
In trap-jaw ants (Odontomachus bauri) ballistic movement can be seen in their extremely rapid mandible strikes. The trap-jaw ants mandible has an average closing speed of 38.4 m/s and can produce forces that are 371-504 times the weight of the ant. The ants use these extremely powerful mandible strikes in several novel ways. When the ant attacks a larger animal it will strike the animal and at the same time use the force from the strike to propel itself away from the animal. When facing prey of similar size such as another ant the strike actually results in both animals being propelled away from each other. When the ant is trying to flee from a predator it will strike at the substrate and propel itself vertically into the air.

=== Crickets ===
In crickets (Acheta domesticus) ballistic movements can be seen in the way they jump. The kicks that propel the cricket occur over a period of only 2-6ms, but during the 18-40ms prior to the kick the potential energy required is built up by the co-contraction of the antagonistic extensor and flexor tibiae. The crickets can also use these same ballistic movements for swimming.

=== Cone snail ===
In the cone snail (Conus catus) ballistic movement can be seen in the way that it fires is harpoon-like radular tooth into its prey. After the cone snail’s proboscis comes in contact with its prey the tooth is ejected 240-295 ms later. It is believed that the propulsion of the tooth is accomplished by pressurizing the fluid space behind the tooth.

=== Salamanders, toads, and chameleons ===
In Salamanders, Toads, and Chameleons ballistic movement can be seen in their tongue projection which is controlled by an elastic recoil mechanism. The orientation of the muscle fibers is significant because it is what allows ballistic movements to be possible. In chameleons, the muscle fibers used for ballistic tongue movements were found to be in a spiral orientation, with an equal amount of fibers oriented clockwise and anti-clockwise to prevent torsional movement of the tongue during projection. The internal fiber angles are approximately 45 degrees, which is the theoretical optimum to create an equal strain throughout the accelerator muscles.

In salamanders of the genus Hydromantes, the pattern of muscle activation has been mapped. The main muscles used for ballistic tongue movements in these salamanders are the subarcualis rectus (SAR) muscles. These SAR muscles can be further divided into anterior (SARA) and posterior (SARP). The first muscle to be activated is the SARA, which is located near the back of the head. The SARA remains active until the tongue makes contact with the prey. Next, the posterior SARP, located further back on the medial and lateral sides of the salamander is activated. Then the middle SARP is activated and the anterior SARP is the last to be activated. The time between activation shortens and duration of activation increases with increasing prey distance. Ballistic tongues have evolved two times previously in the Hemidactyliini and Bolitoglossini genera. The exact mechanisms of tongue projection vary slightly throughout the taxa, but the resulting projections have remained relatively constant.

Frogs do not have a specialized muscular structure for tongue projection. They are able to bypass this issue by using very rapid jaw movement to project the tongue forward. Present in all frogs are the two mandibular muscles that are used to control the jaw and, therefore, tongue projection. The m. genioglossus is used to protract the tongue and the m.hyoglossus is the tongue retractor. Both of these muscles have longitudinally oriented fibers, which is in contrast to the spiral oriented fibers of the chameleon.

=== Application in humans ===
In human, ballistic movements involve spontaneous propulsion of the limbs. This can be seen in daily routines such as reach and strike reactions, which are atomic by nature. Pointing gestures and placing an object are reach reactions; they have low acceleration and deceleration. On the other hand, punching and throwing are strike reactions; they are characterized by high acceleration and deceleration. These movements have highly variable target locations, and they are referred to as “ballistic” in kinesiology. During ballistic movement an initial impulse is needed to accelerate the limb (hand/foot) toward the target, then a decelerating impulse act as a brake to stop the movement. These movements are characterized by a bell-shaped velocity profile. The Bayesian Model (see Bayesian network), which was developed to perform recognition without pose-tracking, explains human ballistic movement as a sequence of movements between objects and the environment. Each movement is independent from precedent and subsequent one, in varying context. Fast single joints movement in humans is controlled by a series of activation of agonist, antagonist and then agonist muscles; this process is called triphasic activation. Those movements are executed “with a pattern of bursts in the agonist and antagonist muscles of fairly constant duration but different amplitude…” (Acornero et al. 1984). Any ballistic movement involving two joints will require an agonist and an antagonist burst; this can be viewed as the building blocks for different types of ballistic movements.
