= First International Congress on Cybernetics =

The First International Congress on Cybernetics was held in Namur, Belgium, 26–29 June 1956. It led to the formation of the International Association for Cybernetics which was incorporated in Belgium on 6 January 1957.

William Grey Walter was involved in organising the congress. Attendees included:

- Stafford Beer: "The impact of cybernetics on the concept of industrial organization"
- Albert Uttley: "A theory on the mechanism of learning based on the computation of conditional probabilities"
- Henryk Greniewski, whose ideas on cybernetics were then published in print in the volume Cybernetics without Mathematics
