= John McCarty =

John McCarty may be:

== Politicians ==
- John McCarty (born 1782), New York state senator
- John McCarty (born 1844), New York state senator

== Sports ==
- John McCarty (baseball), baseball pitcher, 1867-1942

== See also ==
- John McCarthy (disambiguation)
