= ENeuro =

eNeuro
- Discipline: Neuroscience
- Language: English
- Edited by: Christophe Bernard

Publication details
- History: 2014–present
- Publisher: Society for Neuroscience
- Frequency: Continuous
- Open access: Creative Commons Attribution 4.0 International
- Impact factor: 2.7. (2023)

Standard abbreviations
- ISO 4: eNeuro

Indexing
- ISSN: 2373-2822

Links
- Journal homepage

eNeuro is an open-access, peer-reviewed scientific journal published by the Society for Neuroscience. The journal publishes high-quality, broad-based research focused solely on the field of neuroscience. In addition to research manuscripts, eNeuro accepts studies that focus on null results, failure to reproduce, tools and methods, and new theories, as well as commentaries. Its editor-in-chief is Christophe Bernard (Inserm).

== Peer review ==
eNeuro's peer review process is double-blind, meaning that the identity of both the reviewers and the authors is concealed. After the manuscript is reviewed, the Reviewing Editor ensures a consensus between reviewers and editor and then provides a summary to the authors laying out exactly what changes or experiments would be needed for acceptance, or why the manuscript was rejected.
