= John McCarthy (guitarist) =

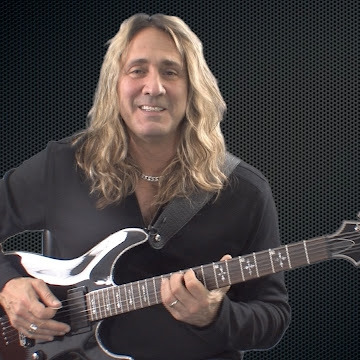
- John McCarthy

Background information
- Birth name: John Frederick McCarthy
- Origin: West Haven, Connecticut
- Instrument(s): Guitar, Piano, Bass Guitar, Ukulele, Vocalist
- Website: http://www.rockhousemethod.com/artist_profile.php?src=a&a=JMCCARTHY

John Frederick McCarthy is a musician, author, educator and creator of the Rock House Method system of learning. Since 2001, The Rock House Method has sold more than three million instructional programs of which McCarthy writes, composes, and demonstrates in. In the past McCarthy has written columns for Guitar School magazine and in June 2009 began writing a monthly column titled "Metal Rising" in Guitar Player magazine. As owner of the Rock House School of Music since 1981, McCarthy has developed a curriculum for learning to play music that covers guitar, piano, ukulele, drums, bass guitar, singing, children's early music development and music theory. His awards and accolades include CTNOW "Best Place to Learn Music" award 2015, 2016, 2017, 2018, 2019, Music & Sound Retailer award for "Best Tools for Schools", Music Merchandise Review "Best Instructional Product of the Year" 2009, 2010, 2011, 2012.

== Educator ==
John McCarthy began providing music lessons at the age of 15 and created the first complete rock guitar instruction series on video in 1986. In 2000, John designed the Rock House Method accelerated learning system that combined instruction in video and book form with an on-line support system. In 2001 John began the mission to take "The Rock House Method" to masses.

John currently has authored over 60 instructional method books, 58 instructional DVDs and 1 instructional DVD rom. John designed and developed a Disney Learn Guitar method featuring the songs of Hannah Montana and High School Musical released in 2009 on DVD-ROM. In addition to his own instructional books and programs John has worked with many of the greatest musicians in the world creating personal instruction programs featuring the Rock House Method, Alexi Laiho, Alex Skolnick, Kiko Loureiro, Jeff Loomis, Bernie Worrell, Oli Herbert, Michael Paget, Rusty Cooley, Dan Jacobs, Rob Arnold, Doug Wimbish, Leo Nocentelli and Dave Ellefson are some of the collaborating artists.

John owns and has been running the Rock House School of Music currently with two locations, West Haven and Wallingford CT. Rock House School of Music is a full service music school offering instruction for guitar, bass, piano, drums, singing and ukulele. In March 2019 the school won the CTNOW award for "Best Place to Take Music Lessons in CT" they also won previously in 2015, 2016, 2017 and 2018. The school also won first place for the Readers' Choice Award's "Best Music Instruction" in 2020 and 2021.

== Musician ==
John began playing guitar at the age of 6 inspired by listening to the vast album collection of his older brother and sisters and states this as the reason he has a wide range of music genres in his vocabulary. When John turned 8 he already had a band playing local camps and parties and at 15 was playing across the tri-state area in clubs. At 15 John opened his first music school called Rock House School of Music. He stayed motivated to further his music studies learning to play Piano, drums, bass guitar, ukulele and sing.

In 2006 John recorded his first solo release "Drive" a full length guitar centered instrumental album. Doug Wimbish of Living Colour fame produced and played bass on the album. Other players on the album include Will Calhoun (Living Colour) on drums, Bernie Worrell (P-Funk and Talking Heads) on keyboards, Leo Nocentelli (The Meters) on guitar, and Jordan Gengreco on keyboards.

== KEYTAB Patent ==
In 2020 John McCarthy was awarded a patent for his revolutionary new way to learn to play piano called KEYTAB. He also launched KEYTAB Music LLC

Every once in a while, a new invention emerges that changes the way people learn. For guitar, bass guitar and all stringed instruments it was “Tablature.” Tablature didn’t eliminate the need for standard music notation reading but it enhanced the learning process helping players learn quickly and more effective. In the same fashion as tablature John McCathy created “KEYTAB” to help piano players learn chords, progressions and complete songs quickly while getting the feel for the instrument in a positive manner.

McCarthy was awarded a US Patent in March 2020 for this unique way to learn piano. The KEYTAB system comes with a “KEYTAB Note Strip”, on this strip every note is labeled and each octave is color coded. The note strip fits perfectly behind the keys on any piano or electronic keyboard. You simply line up the black keys and you are ready to rock.

KEYTAB is also a great way for a casual piano player to learn to play songs quickly. McCarthy explains: “There are so many people that have a piano in their home but never learn to play it. With KEYTAB you can learn songs quickly and easily. Many people want to play piano but don’t want to be a classical player or take years to go through piano methods. KEYTAB is a perfect solution to help people wipe the dust off the piano keys and start learning songs.”

KEYTAB Music LLC has created several Piano KEYTAB Songbooks and will continue to grow their data base of KEYTAB music.

== AmpliTeach ==
In 2024 John McCarthy launched AmpliTeach the worlds first all-in-one platform to run all functions of a music school or any lesson based business. This platform includes scheduling, payments, payroll, curriculum, teacher training, email & text alerts, group emails, build my biz and much more! AmpliTeach is like the brain of any lesson based business it takes care of all of the daily functions automatically. Schools can license AmpliTeach to run their business.

== The Future ==
John McCarthy continues to write instructional books for his Rock House Method brand. The Rock House School of Music is expanding and adding locations and John McCarthy plans to franchise his award-winning schools around the world.

== Body of work ==
=== Instructional books ===
- The Rock House Method Learn Guitar Level 1
- The Rock House Method Learn Guitar Level 2
- The Rock House Method Learn Guitar Level 3
- The Rock House Method Reading Music for Guitar
- The Rock House Method Learn Piano Level 1
- The Rock House Method Learn Piano Level 2
- The Rock House Method Learn Piano Level 3
- The Rock House Method Learn Bass Level 1
- The Rock House Method Learn Bass Level 2
- The Rock House Method Learn Bass Master Edition
- The Rock House Method Learn Guitar Mater Edition
- The Rock House Method Learn Piano Mater Edition
- The Rock House Method Learn Ukulele a Complete Course
- The Rock House Method Master Rock Guitar a Complete Course
- The Rock House Method Master Blues Guitar a Complete Course
- The Rock House Method Lead Singer From Start to Stage
- The Rock House Method Littler Rockers - Your Childs First Musical Steps
- The Rock House Method Modes Demystified
- The Rock House Method Guitar for Kids
- The Rock House Method Piano for Kids
- Rock House Learn Rock Guitar Beginner
- Rock House Learn Rock Guitar Intermediate
- Rock House Learn Rock Guitar Advanced
- Rock House Learn Rock Guitar Course
- Rock House Learn Rock Acoustic Beginner
- Rock House Learn Rock Acoustic Intermediate
- Rock House Children's Guitar Method
- Rock House Clap, Tap, Sing & Swing
- Rock House The Only Chord Book You'll Ever Need – Guitar
- Rock House The Only Chord Book You'll Ever Need – Keyboard
- So Easy Ultimate Guitar Acoustic Guitar Course
- So Easy Ultimate Guitar Electric Guitar Course
- House of Blues Acoustic Guitar Beginner
- House of Blues Electric Guitar Beginner
- House of Blues Acoustic Guitar Course
- House of Blues Electric Guitar Course
- House of Blues Blues Guitar Course
- House of Blues Blues Guitar Level 1
- House of Blues Blues Guitar Level 2
- House of Blues Guitar Master Edition

=== Instructional videos / DVD ===
- Rock House Learn Rock Guitar Beginner
- Rock House Learn Rock Guitar Intermediate
- Rock House Learn Rock Guitar Advanced
- Rock House Learn Rock Guitar Course
- Rock House Learn Rock Acoustic Beginner
- Rock House Learn Rock Acoustic Intermediate
- Rock House Blues Riffs, Rhythms & Secrets
- Rock House Hands of Steel
- Rock House Advanced Metal
- Rock House Modes Demystified
- Rock House Learn Metal Guitar Beginner
- Rock House Learn Metal Guitar Intermediate
- Rock House Learn Metal Guitar Advanced
- Rock House Learn Blues Guitar Beginner
- Rock House Learn Blues Guitar Intermediate
- Rock House Learn Blues Guitar Advanced
- Rock House Lead Guitar
- Rock House Learn to Play Ukulele
- Rock House Modern Classical Guitar
- So Easy Electric Guitar Level 1
- So Easy Electric Guitar Level 2
- So Easy Acoustic Guitar Level 1
- So Easy Acoustic Guitar Level 2
- House of Blues Acoustic Guitar Beginner
- House of Blues Electric Guitar Beginner
- House of Blues Blues Guitar Level 1
- House of Blues Learn Metal Guitar Beginner
- House of Blues Blues Guitar Level 2
- Peavey Play It All Acoustic Guitar
- Peavey Play It All Electric Guitar

=== CD/DVD ROM interactive programs ===
- Disney Learn Guitar Method – featuring the songs of Hannah Montana & High School Musical

=== Branded instructional videos / DVD (featured in guitar packs) ===
- Washburn/Lyon Acoustic and Electric Guitar
- Peavey Acoustic Guitar
- Peavey Electric Guitar
- Silvertone Acoustic Guitar
- Silvertone Electric Guitar
- Burswood Acoustic and Electric Guitar
- SX Acoustic Guitar
- SX Electric Guitar
- Valencia Classical Guitar
- Gypsy Rose Acoustic, Electric and Bass Guitar
- Mahalo Ukulele
- Ashton Acoustic and Electric Guitar
- Spectrum Acoustic Guitar
- Spectrum Electric Guitar
- Spectrum Keyboard
- Behringer Acoustic and Electric Guitar
- Jim Deacan Acoustic and Electric Guitar
- Switch Acoustic and Electric Guitar

=== Custom Artist Programs ===
- Leo Nocentelli (The Meters)
- Doug Wimbish (Living Colour)
- Rob Arnold (Chimaira)
- Marc Rizzo (Soul Fly, Solo Artist)
- Dan Jacobs (Atreyu)
- Alexi Laiho (Children of Bodom)
- David Ellefson (Megadeth)
- Bernie Worrell (P-Funk, Talking Heads)
- Oli Herbert (All That Remains)
- Michael "Padge" Paget (Bullet for My Valentine)
- Bobby Thomson (Job for a Cowboy)
- Kiko Loureiro (Solo Artist, Angra)
- Alex Skolnick (Testament, Alex Skolnick Trio, Trans Siberian Orchestra)
- Gary Hoey (Solo Artist)
- Jeff Loomis (Nevermore, Solo Artist)
- Buz McGrath (Unearth)
- Rusty Cooley (Solo Artist)
- Freekbass Rock House Funk Bass (Solo artist)
- Alex Bach – Guitar for Girls (Solo Artist)

=== John McCarthy CD releases ===
- 13 O’clock – independent release (1999)
- Drive – solo instrumental guitar (2006)
