= David Harris Cohen =

American neurobiologist and academic administrator

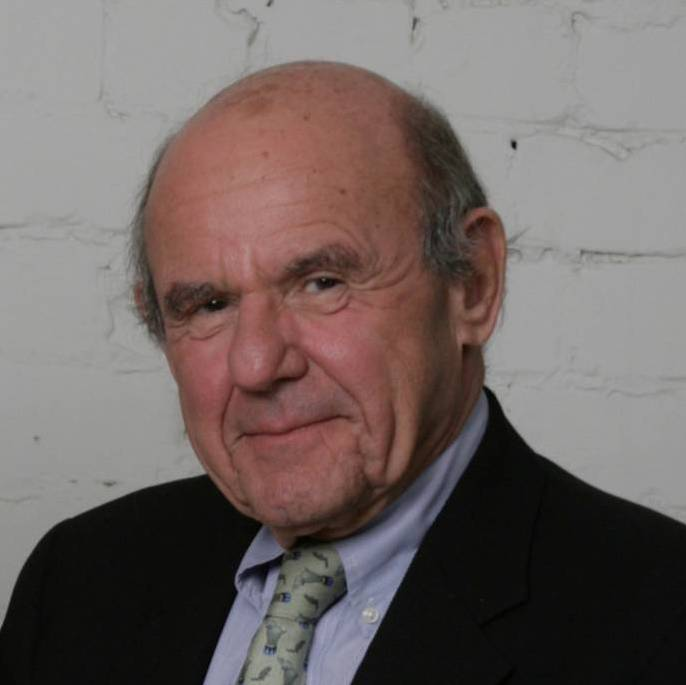
- Cohen in 2012
- Education: Harvard University; University of California, Berkeley
- Scientific career
- Fields: Neuroscience, physiology
- Workplaces: Case Western Reserve University; University of Virginia; Stony Brook University; Northwestern University; Columbia University; University of the People

David Harris Cohen is an American neuroscientist, physiologist, and academic administrator. He is the provost at the University of the People. Cohen was president of the Society for Neuroscience. He was vice president and dean of the faculty at the Columbia Graduate School of Arts and Sciences from 1995 to 2003 and provost of Northwestern University from 1986 to 1995.

== Life ==
Cohen completed a A.B., magna cum laude, at Harvard University in 1960. He earned a Ph.D. in neurobiology in 1963 at University of California, Berkeley.

Cohen was an assistant professor of physiology at Case Western Reserve University. From 1968 to 1979, Cohen was an associate professor of physiology at University of Virginia. Cohen was an associate professor of physiology and chair of the neuroscience department from 1979 to 1986 at Stony Brook University.

Cohen was the provost of Northwestern University from 1986 to 1995. Cohen joined the Columbia Graduate School of Arts and Sciences in 1995 and served as Vice President and Dean of the Faculty of Arts and Sciences, Columbia University from 1995–2003.

He was Vice President and Dean of the Faculty Emeritus of Arts and Sciences, Columbia University (2008–Present).In December 2009, Cohen became provost of the University of the People.

Cohen served as president of the Society for Neuroscience. He is a past chair of the Association of American Medical Colleges. Coen was an associate editor of The Journal of Neuroscience.
