= Elastic mechanisms in animals =

Elastic mechanisms in animals are very important in the movement of vertebrate animals. The muscles that control vertebrate locomotion are affiliated with tissues that are springy, such as tendons, which lie within the muscles and connective tissue. A spring can be a mechanism for different actions involved in hopping, running, walking, and serve in other diverse functions such as metabolic energy conservation, attenuation of muscle power production, and amplification of muscle power production.

When a body is running, walking or hopping, it uses springs as a way to store energy which indicates that elastic mechanisms have a great influence on its dynamics. When a force is applied to a spring it bends and stores energy in the form of elastic strain energy and when it recoils after the force has been released, this energy is released as well. Elastic proteins allow for the spring to deform and retain energy, which can be seen in a hysteresis of a stress-strain curve, as a function of the rate at which it is stretched and unstretched. Elastic proteins also have a high resilience, which is maximized when the rate at which stretching and unstretching are equal to each other; in combination with its low stiffness, this helps these systems minimize energy lost due to elastic strain.

While running, tendons are able to reduce the metabolic rate of muscle activity by reducing the volume of the muscle that is active to produce force. The timing of muscle activation is very important for utilizing the mechanical and energetic benefits of tendon elasticity. Power attenuation by the use of the tendons can allow the muscle-tendon system the ability to absorb energy at a rate beyond the muscles maximum capacity to absorb energy. Power amplification mechanisms are able to work because the spring and muscles contain different intrinsic limits of power. Muscles in a skeletal system can be limited in their maximum power production. Power amplification by the use of the tendons allows the muscle to produce power beyond the muscle's capacity. The mechanical functions of tendons contain a structural basis and are not subjected to limitation of power production.

== Elastic mechanisms for metabolic energy conservation ==
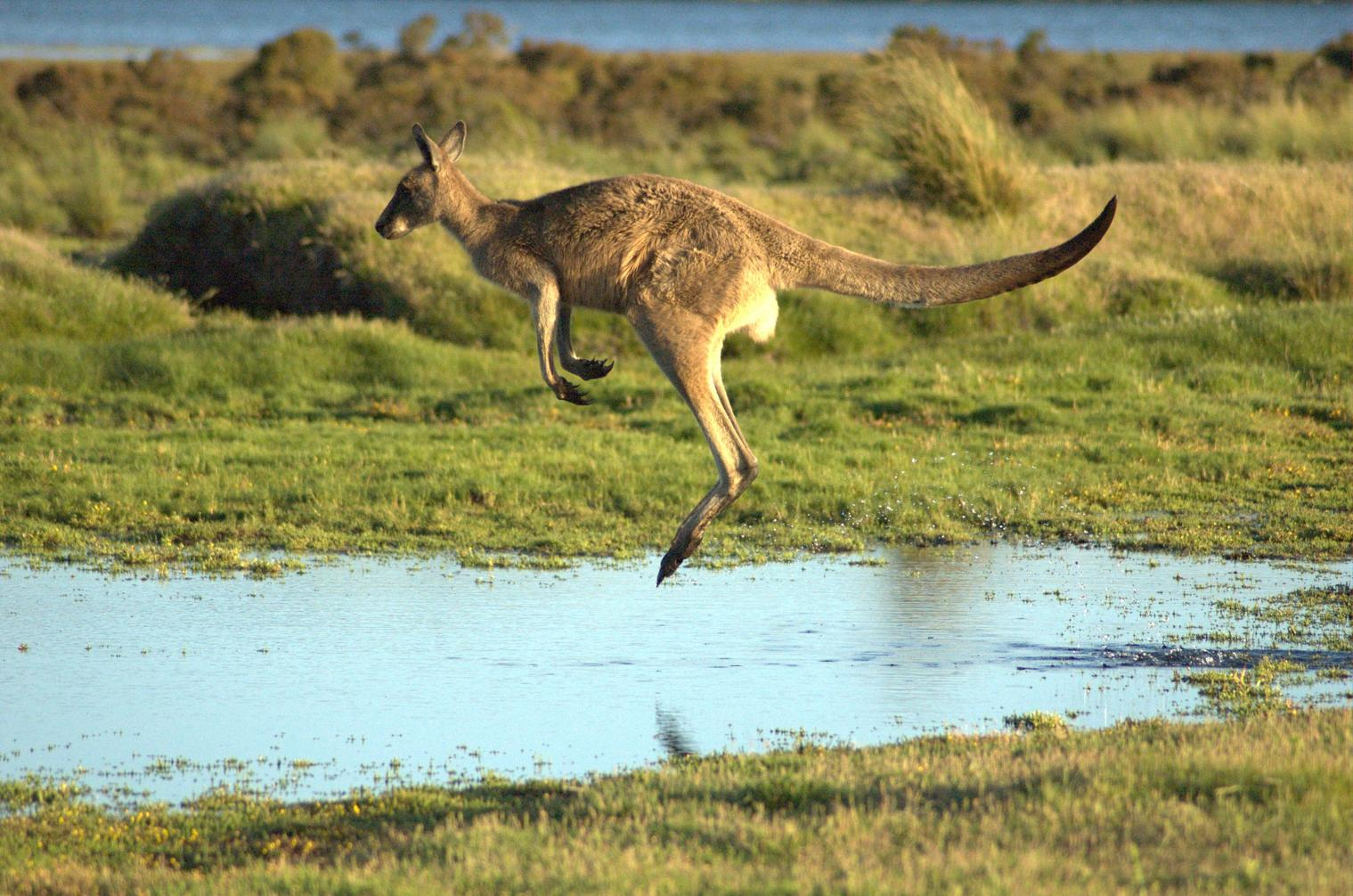
Kangaroos conserve energy between hops using elastic mechanisms

From previous experimental studies on large animals, it was noted that during active locomotion mammals save much of the energy they would otherwise need for running by means of elastic structures in their legs. Measurements been made of the rates of oxygen consumption of various animals, as they walked, ran or hopped, revealed that at high speeds animals seem to save more than a half the metabolic energy they would otherwise need for locomotion. A notable example is jumping in kangaroos. When hopping at slow speeds, their uses of energy increase linearly, but at high speeds, kangaroos can move as cheaply (from an energetic perspective) as if they were moving at slower speeds.

Deep research into the anatomy of large mammals such as, kangaroos and other large ungulates such as deer and gazelle, suggests strongly that some sort of elastic mechanism is important for this energetic savings. Previous combination of careful experiments, with anatomical (e.g. tendon dimensions), mechanical (e.g. force plate recordings) and mathematical calculations revealed that a significant fraction of the work done with each step could be provided by the spring-like action of tendons, rather than by muscle work. When the animal's foot contacts the surface of the ground during high speed locomotion, the tendon or ligament is pressed tightly together, storing elastic energy much like a compressed spring. As the foot gets of the ground, the pressure on the compressed tendons and ligaments is released, and elastic recoil from these spring like structures provides additional force to propel the animal thus resulting in energetic savings. Simple calculations based kangaroo hopping and forces involved in hopping show how storage of elastic strain energy can save twenty to thirty percent of metabolic energy required for hopping. Measurements of oxygen consumption with fluctuations of kinetic and gravitational potential energy, indicate elastic savings of at least fifty four percent at high speeds.

It is important to take under consideration that metabolic benefits of elastic structures are probably most apparent for larger animals, rather than small organisms such as insects. This results from a simple fact, that larger animals can exert much higher forces on their tendons and ligaments during movement, compared to small animals.

== Elastic mechanisms for power attenuation ==
In eccentric contractions, elastic tendons have the ability to operate as power attenuation. Tendons exhibit power attenuation that allows the muscle-tendon systems to absorb energy. This rate exceeds the muscle's maximum capacity for energy. In comparison, power amplification of tendons allow for greater output of power that can exceed the capacity of their respective muscle. This elastic mechanism can lead to the following reductions by lengthening muscles: peak power input, lengthening velocity, and force. Muscle damage has been correlated with these factors. However, the shuttling of energy through tendons before it is absorbed by muscles has been shown to provide a protective mechanism against that damage. However, large accumulations of elastic energy storage over time may negatively affect the timing of recoil. This results in power attenuation.

Though muscles produce and absorb mechanical power, tendons still have an integral role for dissipation of mechanical energy. This action is essential for activities like deceleration, when landing from a jump or downhill running. R.I. Griffiths conducted cross-experiments of isolated muscle-tendon preparations with in vivo studies in 1991 to keep muscles isometric during muscle-tendon unit lengthening. This was achieved with the practice of rapid stretches applied to muscle-tendon units which are then absorbed by the stretch of tendons. Experimenters explain this phenomenon by the idea that muscles are susceptible to damage when actively lengthened and this practice acts as a mechanical buffer against it. In addition, in vivo experiments it has been found that the elastic mechanism gives protection to musculoskeletal structure exceeding the sarcomere. Due to this fact, forces developed in active muscles eventually decide the forces on tendons such as bones, joints, and ligaments.

Similarly, tendons are unable to entirely insulate muscles from dynamic extension. Tendons affect muscles when muscles lengthen, which affects peak forces experienced due to energy absorbing actions in the muscle tendon unit. Active lengthening of muscle fibers results in both an accumulation and loss of energy. Even though energy is briefly stored in stretched elastic elements are also released, there is an overall net gain. This shows that muscle fibers are effective in both power production and for energy consumption utilized by the body or individual body segments with muscle-tendon units.

== Elastic mechanisms as power amplifiers ==
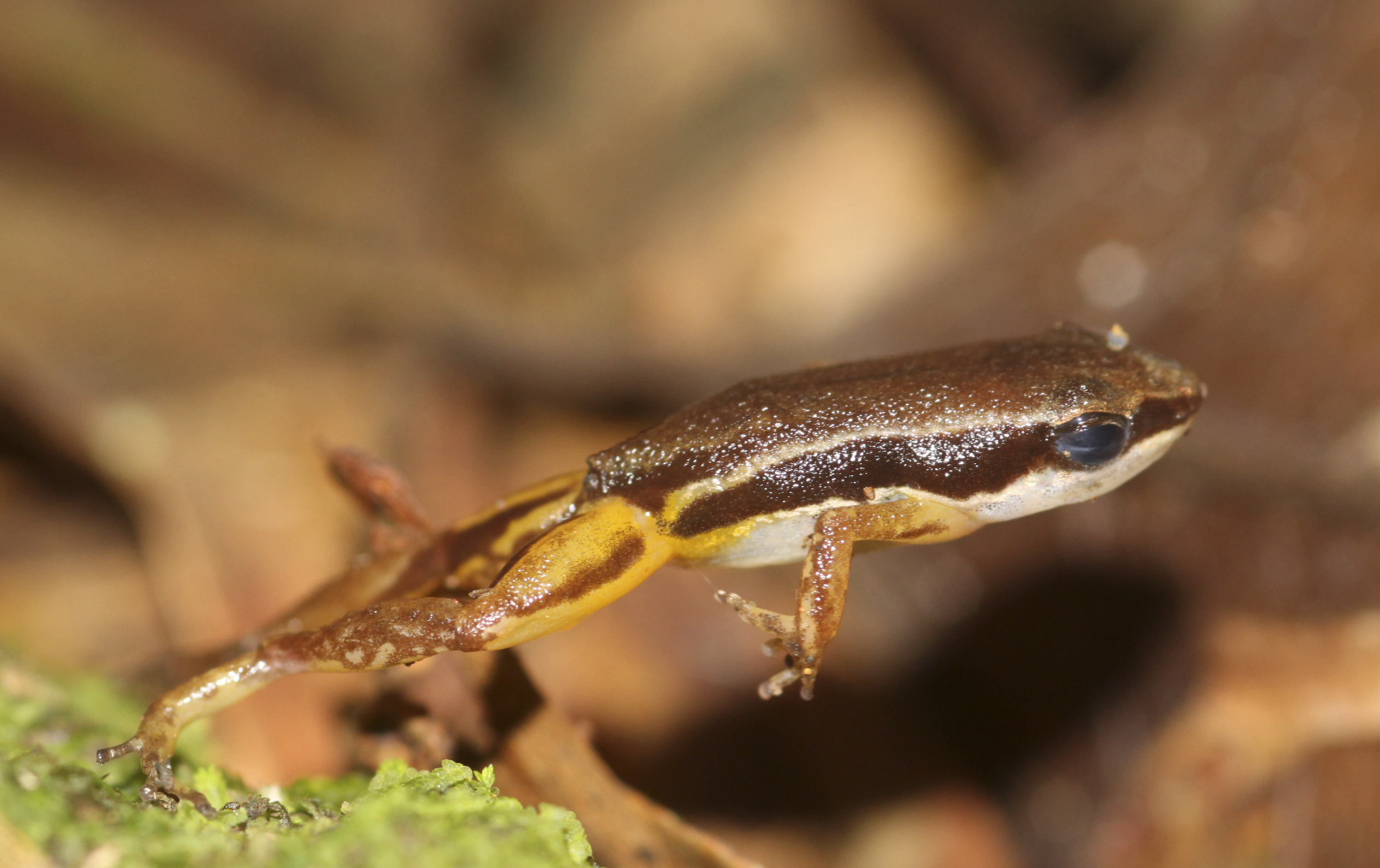
Frogs release stored elastic energy to jump

Tendons, connective tissues, and molecular structures within a skeletal system can act as power amplifiers by storing energy gradually and releasing it rapidly. This amplification process is possible because spring-like tendons are not limited by the same rate limits imposed upon muscles by their intrinsic enzymatic processes. The process of amplification begins when a muscle contracts steadily, storing elastic strain energy in the tendon. Once the energy is completely stored, the tendon releases it in a much shorter time span than was required to create it within the muscle. The tendon is actually producing energy at a level slightly below the work done by the contracting muscle, but because power is equivalent to work over time, the considerably shorter time increases the power significantly.

Although this phenomenon is significantly less efficient than its symmetrical counterpart, this has been observed throughout nature, particularly in smaller species using this for jumping and striking their prey. Some common examples are frogs, birds, trap jaw ants, and mantis shrimp. With jumping in particular, they necessitate rapid acceleration to escape predators, and due to Newton's third law, they can only generate a force while they are in contact with the ground. With the harsh time constraint of the ecosystem, it thus makes sense for this process of power amplification to be advantageous. Substantial improvement, up to several orders of magnitude in the smallest biological systems, in acceleration resulting from these mechanisms have been observed in jumping fleas, accelerating turkeys, the striking of mantis shrimp, and the running of horses whose bicep brachii power output is amplified fifty times by the use of catapult-like behavior of the tendon.

Feeding mechanisms also benefit from spring-like power amplifiers within the skeletal system. The depressor mandibulae of toads rely on this mechanism to produce catapult-like tongue projection. More dramatically, the ballistic tongue projection utilized by chameleons and some salamanders utilize elastic mechanisms to produce mass-specific power outputs more than five times higher than those reported for most fast muscles. In chameleons, it is significant to note that the retractor muscles utilized in prey capture decreased in power output by 600% over a 20 °C temperature range while the tongue projection mechanism, which utilizes the elastic energy storage, decreased a mere 50%, demonstrating that these elastic mechanisms do not simply amplify the power output, but they also extend the temperature range in which power outputs may be amplified.
