= Intermittent control =

Feedback control method

Intermittent control is a type of feedback control where adjustments are not made continuously, but rather in a series of distinct, separate bursts of action. It is used to model human control systems and also has applications in control engineering.

A simple analogy is steering a car. A driver does not apply a perfectly constant steering force but instead makes a series of small, corrective movements of the steering wheel, followed by brief pauses to observe the effect. This "observe-act-wait" cycle is the core of intermittent control. The concept first appeared in studies of human reaction time and motor skills, where it was observed that people act as "an intermittent correction servo."

In control theory, intermittent control is considered a hybrid between continuous control (where corrections are always being made) and discrete-time control (where corrections are made at fixed, clock-like intervals). In intermittent control, the control action is applied over a period of time, but the decision to act is event-driven—triggered by, for example, the system's state deviating too far from the desired state. This approach is useful in networked control systems, where continuous feedback may be impossible or costly, and in predictive control systems that require time for optimization calculations.

== History ==
Intermittent control initially evolved separately in the engineering and physiological literature.

=== Physiological literature ===
The concept of intermittent control appeared in a posthumous paper by Kenneth Craik which states “The human operator behaves basically as an intermittent correction servo”. A colleague of Kenneth Craik, Margaret Vince, related the concept of intermittency to the Psychological refractory period and provided experimental verification of intermittency. Fernando Navas and James Stark showed experimentally that human hand movements were synchronised to input signals rather than to an internal clock: in other words the hand control system is event-driven not clock-driven. The first detailed mathematical model of intermittency was presented by Peter Neilson, Megan Neilson, and Nicholas O’Dwyer. A more recent mathematical model of intermittency is given by PeterGawthrop, Ian Loram, Martin Lakie and Henrik Gollee.

=== Engineering literature ===
In the context of Control Engineering, the term intermittent control was used by Eric Ronco, Taner Arsan and Peter Gawthrop.

They stated that “A conceptual, and practical difficulty with the continuous-time generalised predictive controller is solved by replacing the continuously moving horizon by an intermittently moving horizon. This allows slow optimisation to occur concurrently with a fast control action.” The concept of intermittent model predictive control was refined by Peter Gawthrop working with Liuping Wang, who also looked at event-driven intermittent control.

In a separate line of development Tomas Estrada, Hai Lin and Panos Antsaklis developed the concept of model-based control with intermittent feedback in the context of a networked control system.
