= John Bates (neurophysiologist) =

English neurophysiologist

John Alexander Vincent Bates (1918–1993) was an English neurophysiologist based at the National Hospital for Nervous Diseases from 1946 until his retirement. He was educated at Pembroke College, Cambridge, and went on to complete his clinical training at University College Hospital, London. He became the chief electroencephalographer at the hospital, studying human EEG in relation to voluntary movement. In 1949, he founded the Ratio Club, a dining club of British scientists interested in cybernetics.

Papers relating to Bates and the Ratio Club are held at the Wellcome Library.
