= W. E. Hick =

British psychologist (1912–1974)

- Born: William Edmund Hick; 1 August 1912
- Died: 20 December 1974 (aged 62)
- Education: Durham University (MBBS, MD)
- Occupation: Psychologist
- Scientific career
- Fields: Experimental psychology; Ergonomics

William Edmund Hick (1 August 1912 – 20 December 1974) was a British psychologist, who was a pioneer in the new sciences of experimental psychology and ergonomics in the mid-20th century.

Hick trained as a medical doctor, taking the MB and BSc degrees of the University of Durham in 1938, and the MD of the same university in 1949. He joined the Royal Army Medical Corps in 1941, leaving in 1944 when he moved to Cambridge to join the MRC's Applied Psychology Unit at the Cambridge Psychological Laboratory.

He was appointed Reader by the University of Cambridge in 1953, and was also a Fellow of St. John's College.

He was a founding member of the Experimental Psychology Group and served as its President in 1958, when it became the Experimental Psychology Society. He was also a founder member of the Ergonomics Society and a member of the Ratio Club.

Probably his most famous contribution to experimental psychology was his paper "On the rate of gain of information" (Hick, 1952), which later became known as Hick's law, and widely depended upon in the study of human information processing, for instance using the Jensen box.
