= Jack McCarthy (Australian footballer) =

Australian rules footballer (1884–1939)

Personal information
- Full name: John James McCarthy
- Born: 22 April 1884; Ballarat, Victoria
- Died: 29 June 1939 (aged 55); Hampton East, Victoria
- Original team: Mornington

Playing career^{1}
Years	Club	Games (Goals)
1905	St Kilda	11 (0)
- ^{1} Playing statistics correct to the end of 1905.

John James McCarthy (22 April 1884 – 29 June 1939) was an Australian rules footballer who played for St Kilda in the Victorian Football League (VFL).
