= Clinical Neurophysiology (journal) =

- Discipline: Clinical neurophysiology
- Language: English
- Edited by: U. Ziemann

Publication details
- Former name(s): Electroencephalography and Clinical Neurophysiology
- History: 1949-present
- Publisher: Elsevier (Netherlands)
- Frequency: Monthly
- Impact factor: 3.614 (2017)

Standard abbreviations
- ISO 4: Clin. Neurophysiol.

Indexing
- CODEN: CNEUFU
- ISSN: 1388-2457 (print); 1872-8952 (web)
- LCCN: 99038017
- OCLC no.: 40618487

Links
- Journal homepage; Online access; Online archive; Electroencephalography and Clinical Neurophysiology archives

Clinical Neurophysiology is a monthly peer-reviewed medical journal published by Elsevier. It was established in 1949 as Electroencephalography and Clinical Neurophysiology and obtained its current title in 1999. The journal covers all aspects of neurophysiology, especially as relating to the pathophysiology underlying diseases of the central and peripheral nervous system. It is the official journal of the International Federation of Clinical Neurophysiology, the Brazilian Society of Clinical Neurophysiology, the Czech Society of Clinical Neurophysiology, the Italian Clinical Neurophysiology Society, and the International Society of Intraoperative Neurophysiology.

== Abstracting and indexing ==
The journal is abstracted and indexed in:

- BIOSIS Previews
- Chemical Abstracts
- Current Contents/Clinical Medicine
- Current Contents/Life Sciences
- Index Medicus/MEDLINE/PubMed
- Science Citation Index
- Embase
- Neuroscience Citation Index
- PASCAL
- Elsevier BIOBASE/Current Awareness in Biological Sciences
- Scopus

According to the Journal Citation Reports, the journal has a 2017 impact factor of 3.614.
