= William D. Willis Jr. =

William D. Willis (July 19, 1934 – September 15, 2015) was a neuroscientist and a pioneer in researching pain pathways in the body. He investigated how pain travels through the body and is received in the brain.

== Education ==
Texas A&M University Logo

William attended Texas A&M University and received a bachelor of science in Zoology and a bachelor of arts in English in 1956. He attended University of Texas Southwestern Medical School and received a M.D. in 1960. He then received a Ph.D. in Physiology at Australian National University in 1963 under the tutelage of Sir John Eccles.

== Academic career ==
After receiving his Ph.D. he started his postdoctoral research fellowship at the Instituto di Fisiologia, University of Pisa working with G. Moruzzi as his mentor in 1963. In the same year he returned to the University of Texas Southwestern Medical School as an assistant professor of Anatomy. In 1964 he was appointed Chairman of its Anatomy Department.

In 1970 Willis became Chief of the Comparative Neurobiology Division at the Marine Biomedical Institute. In 1978 he became the Director at the Marine Biomedical Institute and in 1986 the Professor and Chairman of the Department of Anatomy & Neurosciences. He held the Ashbel Smith Professor (1986-1994)and the Cecil H. and Ida M. Green Chair in Marine Sciences (1994-2007) followed by the Cecil H. and Ida M. Green Distinguished Chair in Neuroscience upon his retirement.

== Research ==
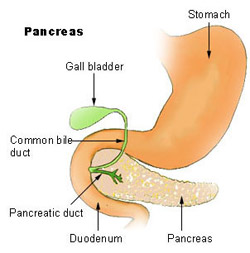
The Pancreas in the Human Body

Willis focused much of his research on pain. He was an honorary member and councilor of the International Association for the Study of Pain (IASP). He studied how pain travels through the body to the brain in carrying out research on how the neurons in your brain react when presented with a stimulus. Together with his research team, he used certain diseases to study pain like chronic pancreatitis, finding that it had to do with the number of mast cells.

== Publications ==
Throughout Willis' life he published 311 journal articles, 103 books and symposium chapters, and contributed to 12 textbooks. All of this was with the help of the National Institutes of Health who funded his research career.

== Awards and honors ==
- From 1986-1994 he held the title of Ashbel Smith Professor.
- From 1994-2007 he held the title of Cecil H. and Ida M. Green Chair in Marine Sciences.
- When Willis died he was holding the title of Cecil H. and Ida M. Green Distinguished Chair in Marine Sciences.
- He was named president of organizations such as the Society of Neuroscience (1984-1985), The American Pain Society and Cajal Club.
- Willis was also the editor-in-chief for two science journals and was also on the editorial board for ten other science journals.

== Legacy ==
Willis was one of the pioneers in studying pain processing in the neural pathways. Most of the information known about the spinothalamic pathway is from the work of Willis. Willis was mentored by Sir John Carew Eccles at Australian National University.
