= John V. McCarthy =

American politician (1932–1987)

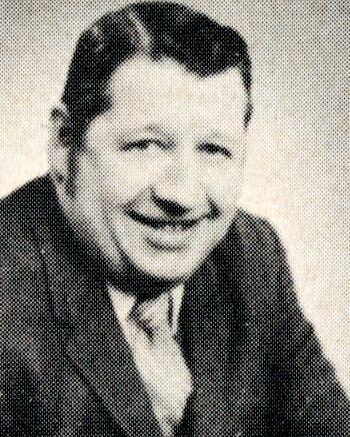

Member of the Ohio House of Representatives from the 81st district
- In office January 3, 1969-December 31, 1972
- Preceded by: Tom Gilmartin
- Succeeded by: Tom Gilmartin

Personal details
- Party: Democratic

John V. McCarthy (c. 1932 – May 24, 1987) was a member of the Ohio House of Representatives. While in office, he was the sponsor of a bill proposing the establishment of medical schools at three Ohio universities. He left office in 1972 in order to run for election for treasurer of Mahoning County, Ohio, but did not win the election.
