= Sholl analysis =

Sholl analysis is a method of quantitative analysis commonly used in neuronal studies to characterize the morphological characteristics of an imaged neuron, first used to describe the differences in the visual and motor cortices of cats in the early 1950s. Donald A. Sholl was interested in comparing the morphology of different types of neurons, such as the star-shaped stellate cells and the cone-shaped pyramidal cells, and of different locations in the dendritic field of the same type of neurons, such as basal and apical processes of the pyramidal neuron. He looked at dendritic length and diameter (Sholl, p. 389, Fig. 1) and also the number of cells per volume (Sholl, p. 401, The packing density of perikarya).

While methods for estimating the number of cells have vastly improved since 1953 with the advent of unbiased stereology, the method Sholl used to record the number of intersections at various distances from the cell body is still in use and is actually named after Sholl. "In order to study the way in which the number of branches varies with the distance from the perikaryon, it is convenient to use a series of concentric spherical shells as co-ordinates of reference. ...... these shells have their common centre in the perikaryon" (Sholl, p. 392, The manner of dendritic branching). What Sholl called the 'Concentric Shell Method' is now known as 'Sholl Analysis'. As well as the number of intersections per concentric shell, Sholl also calculated the mean diameter of the dendrites or axons within each concentric shell (Sholl, p. 396, table 2 and 3). Sholl appreciated that his method is good for comparing neurons, for instance in figure 8 the differences in the number of dendritic intersections correlated with distance from the cell body is compared between neurons from the motor and visual cortex. Sholl also realized his method is useful to determine where and how big is the region where synapses are possible, something he called the neuron's 'connective zone'.

In 1953, Sholl was working with projections of 3D neurons into two dimensions, but now Sholl analysis can be done on 3D images (e.g. image stacks or 3D montages) of neurons, making the concentric circles truly three-dimensional shells. In addition to intersections and diameter: total dendritic length, surface area, and volume of processes per shell; number of nodes, endings, varicosities and spines per shell; and branching order of the dendrites in each shell, can be included in the analysis. For modern examples of the use of Sholl analysis to analyze neurons. Curves produced from the 'number of intersections vs. distance from the cell body data' are usually of somewhat irregular shape, and much work has been done to determine appropriate means of analyzing the results. Common methods include Linear Analysis, Semi-log Analysis and Log-Log Analysis

== Linear Method ==
The Linear Method is the analysis of the function N(r), where N is the number of crossings for a circle of radius r. This direct analysis of the neuron count allows the easy computation of the critical value, the dendrite maximum, and the Schoenen Ramification Index.

Critical Value: The critical value is the radius r at which there is a maximum number of dendritic crossings, this value is closely related to the dendrite maximum.

Dendrite Maximum: This value is the maximum of the function N(r), as specified by the Critical Value for a given data set.

Schoenen Ramification Index: This index is one measure of the branching of the neuronal cell being studied. It is calculated by dividing the Dendrite Maximum by the number of primary dendrites, that is, the number of dendrites originating at the cell's soma.

== Semi-Log Method ==
Somewhat more complicated than the Linear Method, the Semi-Log Method begins by calculating the function Y(r) = N/S where N is the number of dendrite crossings for a circle of radius r, and S is the area of that same circle. The base 10 logarithm is taken of this function, and a first order linear regression, linear fit, is performed on the resulting data set, that is

$$\log_{10}\left(\frac{N}{S}\right) = -k \cdot r + m$$.

where k is Sholl's Regression Coefficient.

Sholl's Regression Coefficient is the measure of the change in density of dendrites as a function of distance from the cell body. This method has been shown to have good discrimination value between various neuron types, and even similar types in different regions of the body.

== Log-Log Method ==
Closely related to the Semi-Log Method, the Log-Log Method plots the data with the radius plotted in log space. That is the researcher would calculate the value k and m for the relation

$$\log_{10}\left(\frac{N}{S}\right) = -k \cdot \log_{10}(r) + m$$.

This method is used in a manner similar to the Semi-Log Method, but primarily to treat neurons with long dendrites that do not branch much along their length.

== Modified Sholl Method ==
The Modified Sholl Method is the calculation of a polynomial fit of the N and r pairs from the Linear Method. That is, it attempts to calculate a polynomial such that:

$$\ N(r)\ = a_0 + a_1*r + a_2*r^2 + ... + a_t*r^t .$$

where t is the order of the polynomial fit to the data. The data must be fit to each of these polynomials individually, and the correlation calculated in order to determine the best fit. The maximum value of the polynomial is calculated and used in place of the Dendrite Maximum. Additionally, the average of the resulting polynomial can be determined by taking its integral for all positive values represented in the data set (most data sets contain some zero values).

== Drawbacks ==
Sholl analysis is used to measure the number of crossings processes make at different distances from the centroid, and is a type of morphometric analysis. It is primarily used to measure arbour complexity. Certain morphologies cannot however be indexed using Sholl alone. For instance it may not make sense to compare neurons with arbors that take up small volumes to those that take up large volumes, and instead an analysis like 'complexity index' could be used. Also, dendrite thickness of a whole dendrite cannot be measured, only the mean thickness of the dendrites within a shell. Dendrite length of a given dendrite also cannot be determined, since dendrites do not necessarily emanate radially from the soma; dendrites can curve, cross the same circles multiple times, or extend tangentially and not cross at a circle at all. Additionally, Sholl analysis can be time consuming, and automated analysis software is limited.

== Neurite ramification and Sholl analysis ==
Using the Sholl analysis, a mathematical algorithm named the branching index (BI) has been described to analyze neuronal morphology. The BI compares the difference in the number of intersections made in pairs of consecutive circles of the Sholl analysis relative to the distance from the neuronal soma. The BI distinguishes neurons with different types of neurite ramification.

== Software ==
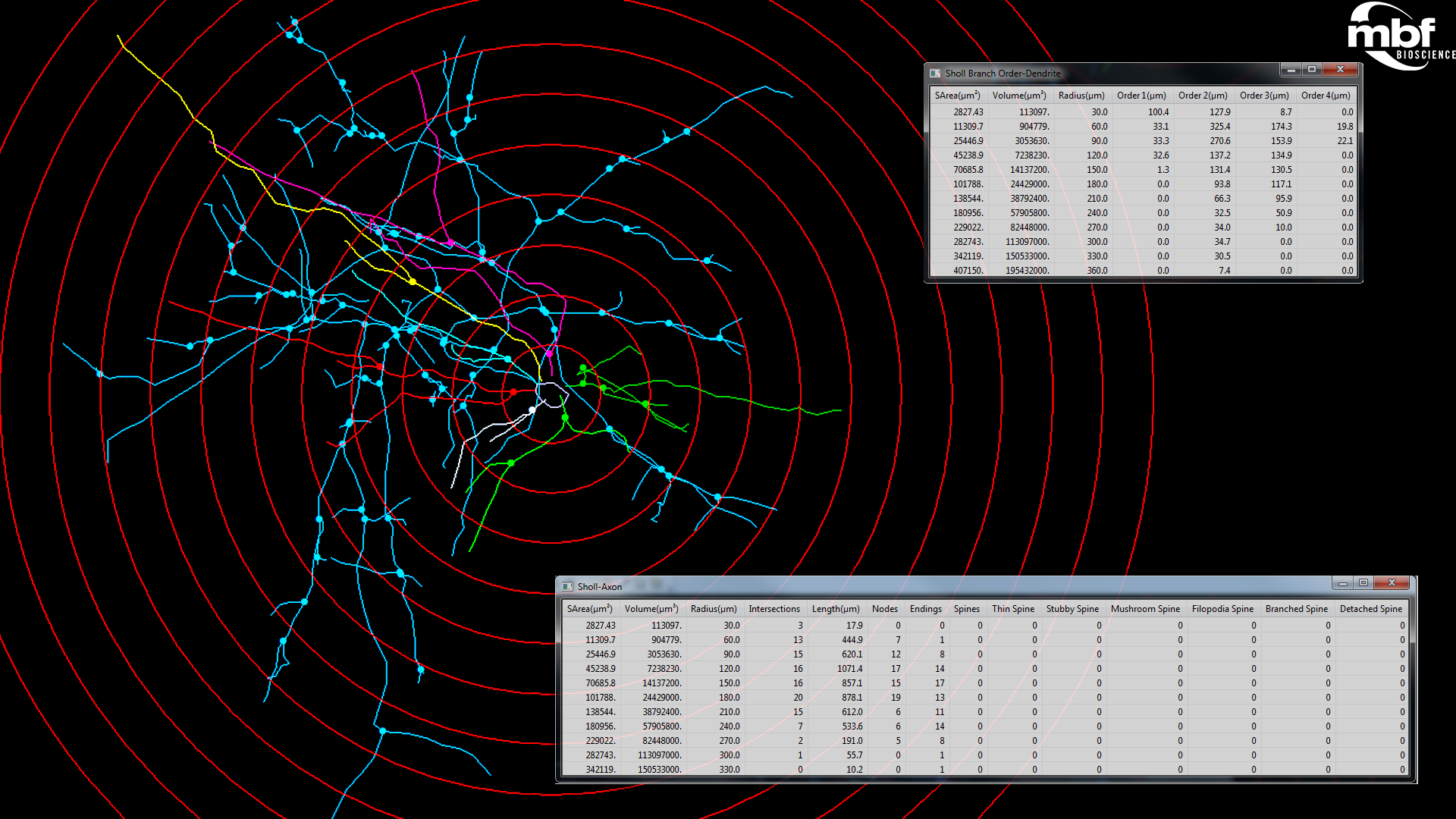
Sholl analysis in Neurolucida© software (a proprietary closed-source software package for neuronal tracing)

Several software packages perform Sholl analysis, namely those dedicated to neuronal tracing. An open-source implementation for the image processing package Fiji can be used to perform the analysis directly from microscope imagery of neurons or their traced reconstructions.

In modern implementations, analysis is performed in three dimensions: concentric shells are nested around a centre, and a surrogate of neurite mass (e.g., number of intersections, or total neurite length) contained within each shell is reported. Such software is amenable to high-throughput studies .

== See also ==
- Neuromorphology
