= Phil Husbands =

English academic and computer scientist

- Born: June 27, 1961 (age 65)
- Known for: GasNets (with Michael O'Shea); The Mechanical Mind in History
- Scientific career
- Fields: Computer science, artificial intelligence, evolutionary algorithms, computational neuroscience, swarm intelligence, machine learning
- Workplaces: University of Sussex

Phil Husbands (born 27 June 1961) is a professor of computer science and artificial intelligence at the University of Sussex. He is head of the Evolutionary and Adaptive Systems group and co-director of the Centre for Computational Neuroscience and Robotics (CCNR).

== Research ==
Husbands's research interests are in long-term investigations of artificial evolution of nervous systems for robots, with emphasis on:

- visually guided robots acting in the real world
- theoretical and practical development of advanced evolutionary algorithms for hard engineering and design optimisation problems
- development of biologically inspired artificial neural networks incorporating diffusible modulators
- computational neuroscience
- computer manipulation of sound and image
- history and philosophy of AI
- swarm intelligence
- machine learning.

Husbands has edited several books, including coediting The Mechanical Mind in History (MIT Press; 2008; ISBN 978-0-262-25638-4) and Robots: What everyone needs to know, as well as author of numerous scientific articles. With neuroscientist Michael O'Shea he introduced the idea of GasNets – artificial neural networks that use diffusing virtual gases as modulators. These are inspired by nitric oxide (NO) volume signalling in real brains. The Sussex team has also done pioneering work on detailed computational modelling of nitric oxide diffusion in the nervous system.

== See also ==
- List of computer scientists
