= Membrane Protein Structural Dynamics Consortium =

Membrane Protein Structural Dynamics Consortium (MPSDC)
- Formation: 2010
- Purpose: "elucidate the relationship between structure, dynamics and function in a variety of membrane proteins"
- Headquarters: University of Chicago
- Principal Investigator: Eduardo Perozo, Ph.D.
- Budget: 5 year NIGMS Glue Grant
- Website: www.memprotein.org

The Membrane Protein Structural Dynamics Consortium (MPSDC) is a large scale collaborative consortium composed of an interdisciplinary team of scientists who use biophysical and computational methods to understand how the structure and movement of membrane proteins determine their functions. The Consortium conducts research on membrane protein function of energy transduction in signaling (ion channels and receptors) and energy interconversion (transporters and pumps) from a mechanistic perspective. The project was funded in May 2010 by the National Institute of General Medical Sciences as a Glue Grant which supports the research of complex biological problems that cannot be solved by a single research group. The MPSDC was largely spurred by the urgent, compelling need for high-resolution approaches to membrane protein structure and dynamics.

== Organization ==
By NIGMS program mandate, Glue Grant consortia must contain Core Resources and Bridging Projects. The MPSDC consists of three Scientific Cores and seven Bridging Projects, which are designed to interact with one another. The Scientific Cores provide research support and develop new methodologies in the following fields: Membrane protein expression and production, synthetic antigen binder generation, and the use of innovative computational methods to interpret and supplement existing experimental methods. The Bridging Projects are sub-projects that tie together or enhance the contribution of the independent work and expertise of the participating investigator to the Consortium and expand the independent work in new directions.

== Funding ==
The MPSDC was established in May 2010 with $22.5 million in funding over a 5-year period (grant number GM087519). Pending project success and assessment of the Glue Grant funding mechanism, the grant may be renewed for an additional 5 years in 2015.
