= Bidirectional cell =

Bidirectional cells are a subset of neurons found in mammalian brains in region MT. They are characterised by having a peak response to visual motion in two, opposing, directions. They were discovered in 1984 by Albright et al.
