= Red neuron =

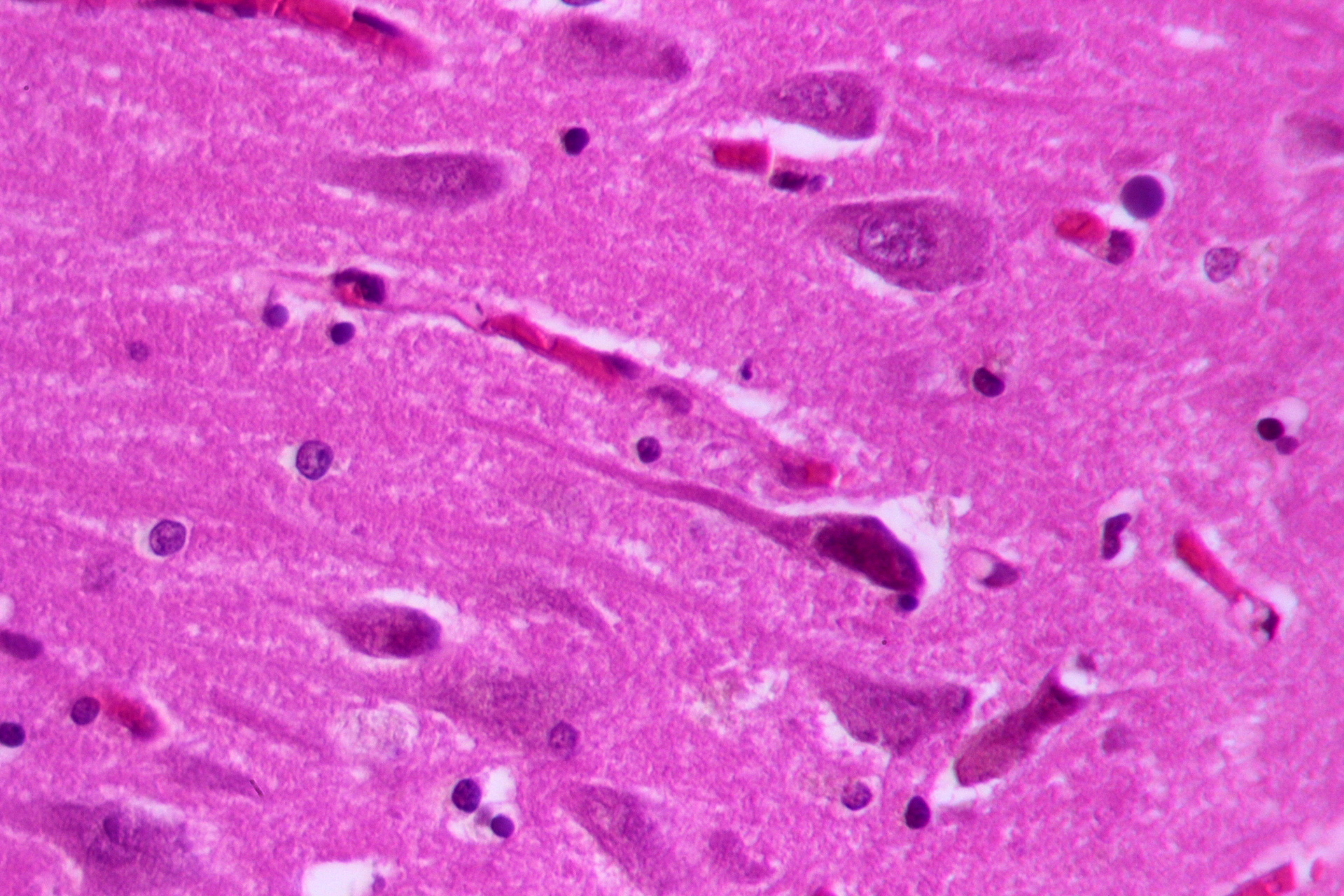
Normal and red neurons

A "red neuron" (acidophilic or "eosinophilic" neuron) is a pathological finding in neurons, generally of the central nervous system, indicative of acute neuronal injury and subsequent apoptosis or necrosis. Acidophilic neurons are often found in the first 12–24 hours after an ischemic injury such as a stroke. Since neurons are permanent cells, they are most susceptible to hypoxic injury. The red coloration is due to pyknosis or degradation of the nucleus and loss of Nissl bodies which are normally stained blue (basophilic) on hematoxylin & eosin staining (H&E stain). This leaves only the degraded proteins which stains red (eosinophilic). Acidophilic neurons also can be stained with acidic dyes other than eosin (e.g. acid fuchsin and light green yellowish).
