= Neuronal galvanotropism =

Neuronal galvanotropism is the ability to direct the outgrowth of neuronal processes through the use of an extracellular electric field. This technique has been researched since the late 1920s and has been shown to direct the formation of both axonic and dendritic processes in cell culture. It is only possible to direct outgrowth of in vitro preparations at this point. In vitro preparations involve the use of a culture dish, in which there is a species-specific neuronal growth factor. Neurons are removed from a chosen animal, plated onto the dish and allowed to grow (often kept in incubation). The application of an extracellular electric field shows that the cells will grow processes in a direction that demonstrates the direction of the applied electric field. This could be either in the direction of the cathode or anode, depending on the type of substrate the cells are plated onto.

The mechanism underlying this behavior is thought to involve the effect of the electric field on receptors and membrane proteins on the cell's surface. These charged proteins would experience an electrophoretic force pulling them toward the oppositely charged pole of the electric field. Most of these membrane proteins are negatively charged, but the growth, when observed appears to be directed to the negative pole (cathode). This is a strange behavior that can only be accounted for by electroosmotic effects. Positively charged ions outside the cell experience a force towards the cathode. There is a flux of these ions outside the cell and the shear force of solution movement is thought to pull the neurite in the cathodal direction. Also, the electric field may depolarize the cell near the cathodal side opening voltage-gated calcium channels and allowing calcium ions to enter the cell. Calcium is widely believed to be a factor in neurite outgrowth. This theory has been challenged in a recent paper by scientists at Purdue University. Recent studies also involve differentiating between the effect of current on growth direction and the effect of a simple electric field. Studies involving AC and DC fields are also being conducted.

This is currently a highly researched topic, in which many neuroscience labs around the world are attempting to be the first to have a feasible method of directing outgrowth. Potential applications involve the direction and regeneration of severed nerves although these would only become available in the very distant future. This technique would also be useful in the study of neuronal networks. Neurites could be directed toward each other over large distances and allowed to form synapses. Networks of hundreds or thousands of cells could be constructed and studied.
