= Non-spiking neuron =

Non-spiking neurons are neurons that are located in the central and peripheral nervous systems and function as intermediary relays for sensory-motor neurons. They do not exhibit the characteristic spiking behavior of action potential generating neurons.

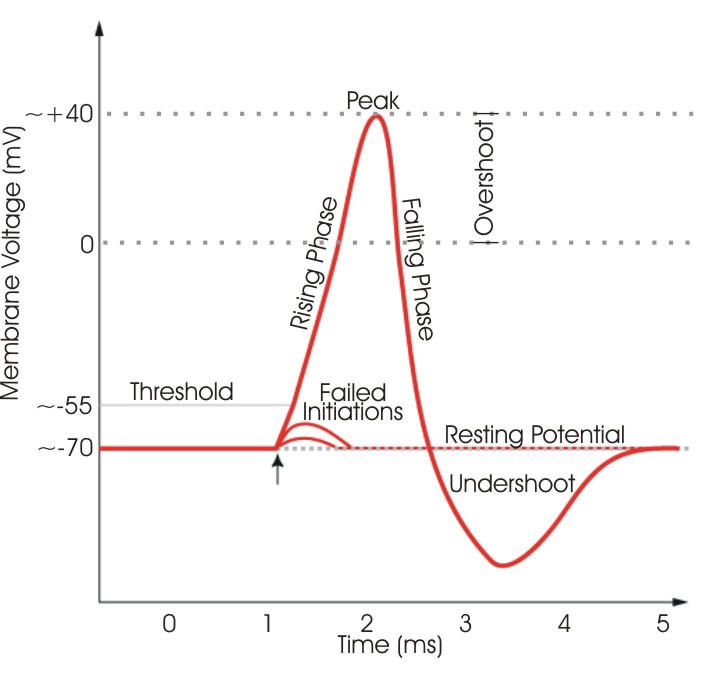
Characteristic spiking behavior of neuron

Qualities	Spiking neurons	Nonspiking neurons
Location	Peripheral and central	Peripheral and central
Behavior	Action potential	Fewer sodium channel proteins

Non-spiking neural networks are integrated with spiking neural networks to have a synergistic effect in being able to stimulate some sensory or motor response while also being able to modulate the response.

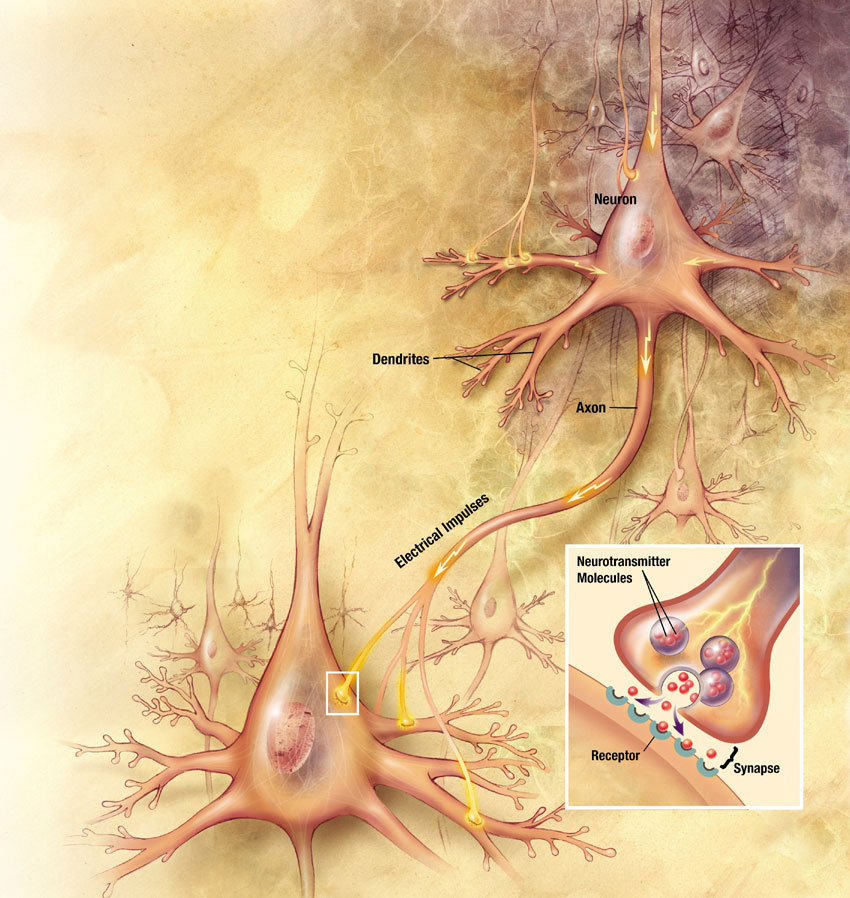
Neural synapse

== Discovery ==
=== Animal models ===
There are an abundance of neurons that propagate signals via action potentials and the mechanics of this particular kind of transmission is well understood. Spiking neurons exhibit action potentials as a result of a neuron characteristic known as membrane potential. Through studying these complex spiking networks in animals, a neuron that did not exhibit characteristic spiking behavior was discovered. These neurons use a graded potential to transmit data as they lack the membrane potential that spiking neurons possess. This method of transmission has a huge effect on the fidelity, strength, and lifetime of the signal. Non-spiking neurons were identified as a special kind of interneuron and function as an intermediary point of process for sensory-motor systems. Animals have become substantial models for understanding more about non-spiking neural networks and the role they play in an animal's ability to process information and its overall function. Animal models indicate that the interneurons modulate directional and posture coordinating behaviors. Crustaceans and arthropods such as the crawfish have created many opportunities to learn about the modulatory role that these neurons have in addition to their potential to be modulated regardless of their lack of exhibiting spiking behavior. Most of the known information about nonspiking neurons is derived from animal models. Studies focus on neuromuscular junctions and modulation of abdominal motor cells. Modulatory interneurons are neurons that are physically situated next to muscle fibers and innervate the nerve fibers which allow for some orienting movement. These modulatory interneurons are usually nonspiking neurons. Advances in studying nonspiking neurons included determining new delineations among the different types of interneurons. These discoveries were due to the usage of methods such as protein receptor silencing. Studies have been done on the non-spiking neuron qualities in animals of specific non-spiking neural networks that have a corollary in humans, e.g. retina amacrine cell of the eye.

== Physiology ==
=== Definition ===
A non-spiking neuron is a neuron that transmits a signal via graded potential. The rate of subsequent neurotransmitter release is linearly correlated with the magnitude and sign of summed inputs which allows them to preserve specific features of the eliciting stimulus, such as light quanta information by photoreceptors. They are a fundamental component of visual processing in the retina. They can be more susceptible to noise. Studies show that these neurons may offer a contribution to learning and modulation of motor neuron networks.

Spiking neurons and non-spiking neurons are usually integrated into the same neural network, but they possess specific characteristics. The major difference between these two neuron types is the manner in which encoded information is propagated along a length to the central nervous system or to some locus of interneurons, such as a neuromuscular junction. Non-spiking neurons propagate messages without eliciting an action potential. This is most likely due to the chemical composition of the membranes of the non-spiking neurons. They lack protein channels for sodium and are more sensitive to certain neurotransmitters. They function by propagating graded potentials and serve to modulate some neuromuscular junctions. Spiking neurons are noted as traditional action potential generating neurons.

=== Identification ===
"Interneurons" is a name used to indicate neurons that are neither sensory neurons nor motor neurons, but function as an intermediary processing and transmission state for signals that have been received via dorsal root ganglia cells. A large amount of these interneurons seem to exhibit the non-spiking characteristic. To better define non-spiking neuron signal transmission and signal transduction, many experiments have been performed to qualify and quantify the fidelity, speed, and mechanics of signal transmission in non-spiking neurons. There have been classifications based on the larger group "interneurons" where pre-motor nonspiking neurons are referred to as postlateral (PL) or anteriolateral (AL) interneurons, with AL interneurons divided into three types of interneurons based on staining. The initial differentiation between PL and AL interneurons are their responses to GABA, a neurotransmitter for muscle tone. They also have different staining responses permitting quick and qualified classification.

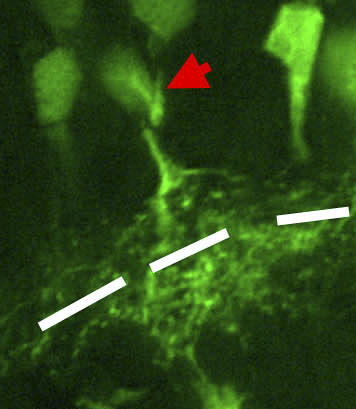
A retinal amacrine cell

=== Cell types ===
Many of the nonspiking neurons are found near neuromuscular junctions and exist as long fibers that help to innervate certain motor nerves such as the thoracic-coxal muscle receptor organ (TCMRO) of a crab. They function in a modulatory role by helping to establish posture and directional behavior. This was intensely modeled in the crustacean and in insects showing how appendages are oriented via these nonspiking neural pathways. Amacrine cells are another major type of non-spiking neuron and their lifetime involves the conversion to a non-spiking neuron from a spiking neuron once the retina obtains maturity. They are one of the first cells to differentiate during prenatal development. Upon the opening of the eyes, these cells begin to shed their sodium ion channels and become non-spiking neurons. It was hypothesized that the reason for its establishment as a spiking neuron was to help with the maturation of the retina by the usage of action potentials themselves, and not necessarily the information the action potential carried. This was supported with the occurrence of synchronous firing by the starburst amacrine cells during the initial stages of development. This study used a rabbit model. However, spiking wide field amacrine cells have been identified in the adult rabbit retina. These cells extend processes spanning >1mm across the retina and actively propagate dendritic spikes to and from the soma Additionally, a spiking GABAergic nitric oxide producing amacrine cell type (nNOS-1 AC) has been identified in mice and is thought to play a role in precise feature extraction from light through a range of noisy background luminance.

=== Physiological characteristics ===
Some studies have indicated that even with the volatility of signal transmission with these particular neurons, they still perform very well in maintaining signal strength. Studies show that the ratio of signal to noise in experimental settings of some signals are at least 1000 and upwards to 10000 over 5-7mm of propagation length by nerves.

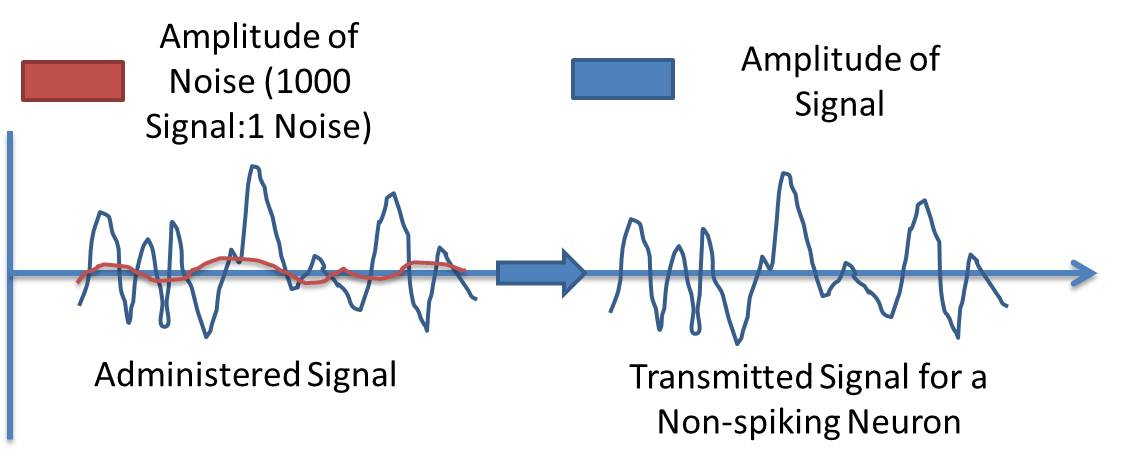
Effect of noise on non-spiking neuron transmission

These interneurons are connected to one another via synapses and a minority, approximately 15% of the neurons, exhibit bidirectional capacity and were excitatory. About 77% of these neurons indicated a one-way mode of transmitting signals which were inhibitory in nature. These numbers were modeled from an arthropod as pre-motor elements in the motor control system. They were located in the abdominal region. Synapses are known as gaps between neurons which facilitate the spread of a message via neurotransmitters that may excite or depress the subsequent neuron through a complex cascade of electrochemical events. For the interneurons exhibiting one-way signaling, they would receive an excitatory stimulus, experimentally, and the post-synaptic cell was given an inhibitory signal. The interaction between the two cells was modulatory in which the pre-synaptic cell with the initial excitatory signal would mediate the postsynaptic cell even after being inhibited. Signal amplitude was used to determine the effects of the modulation on the signal transmission.

The speed of signal transmission at 200 Hz, the most conserved bandwidth of signal transmission for non-spiking neurons, was approximately 2500 bits/second in which there was a 10-15% decrease in speed as the signal propagated down the axon. A spiking neuron compares at 200bits/ second, but reconstruction is greater and there is less influence by noise. There are other non-spiking neurons that exhibit conserved signal transmission at other bandwidths.

Cell Type	Characteristics
Arthropod	Orienting motor control
Rabbit amacrine cell	Eyes, establishment of function
Crustacean	Orienting motor control; 2500 bit/s; bandwidth of 200 Hz

While some non-spiking neurons are specifically involved in neuromuscular modulation, studying amacrine cells has created opportunities to discuss the role of non-spiking neurons in neuroplasticity. Since amacrine cells, which are a type of non-spiking neurons, undergo a transformation from spiking to non-spiking cells, there have been many studies that try to identify the functional reasons for such a transformation. Starburst amacrine cells use action potentials during retinal development, and once the retina is mature, these cells transform into non-spiking neurons. The change from a cell that can generate action potentials to solely functioning off of a graded potential is drastic, and may provide insight into why the two kinds of neural networks exist. The cells lose sodium channels. The loss of the sodium channels is triggered by the opening of the eye correlating to the possibility of the environment playing a crucial role in determination of neural cell types. The rabbit animal model was used to develop this particular study. This transition is not quite understood but heavily concludes that the spiking and non-spiking statuses occupied by the starburst amacrine cells are vital to the maturation of the eyes.

== Functions ==
=== Modulation ===
By using known neurotransmitters that affect non-spiking neurons, modeled neural networks may be modified to either ease neuromuscular hyperactivity, or cells themselves may be transformed to be able to provide stronger signals. A calcium transporter study indicates the effect that protein channels have on the overall fidelity and firing capacity of the non-spiking neurons. Since most of the propagated messages are based on a proportionality constant, meaning, there is not a temporal or spatial significance to the presynaptic firing, these signals literally "repeat what they have been told". When it comes down to chemical systems in the body, a non-spiking neural network is definitely an area of exploration. The amacrine cell study poses new and exciting components to the study of altering the chemical and mechanical properties of the non-spiking neural networks.

=== Memory and learning ===
Very little is known about the application of these networks to memory and learning. There are indications that spiking and nonspiking networks both play a vital role in memory and learning. Research has been conducted with the use of learning algorithms, microelectrode arrays, and hybrots. By studying how neurons transfer information, it becomes more possible to enhance those model neural networks and better define what clear information streams could be presented. Perhaps, by conjoining this study with the many neurotrophic factors present, neural networks could be manipulated for optimal routing, and consequently optimal learning.

=== Device production ===
By studying the nonspiking neuron, the field of neuroscience has benefited by having workable models that indicate how information is propagated through a neural network. This allows for the discussion of the factors that influence how networks work, and how they may be manipulated. Non-spiking neurons seem to be more sensitive to interference given that they exhibit graded potentials. So for non-spiking neurons, any stimulus will elicit a response, whereas spiking neurons exhibit action potentials which function as an "all or none" entity.

In biomedical engineering, it is a priority to understand the biological contributions to an overall system in order to understand how the systems may be optimized. Paul Bach y Rita was a famous believer of neuroplasticity and integrated the principles of device design in order to model what neurons were actually doing in the brain and create a device that simulated functions already prescribed by the biological system itself. Some special advances made in the medical field based on structured models of biological systems include the cochlear implant, practices encouraged by Dr. VS Ramachandran on phantom limbs and other optical applications, and other devices that simulate electrical impulses for sensory signal transduction. By continuing to achieve a workable model of the non-spiking neural network, its applications will become evident.

== See also ==
- Transduction (biophysics)
- EPSP (excitatory post-synaptic potential)
- IPSP (inhibitory post-synaptic potential)
