= Transduction (biophysics) =

Conveyance of energy from one electron to another while also changing type

In biophysics, transduction is the conveyance of energy from one electron (a donor) to another (a receptor), at the same time that the class of energy changes.

Photonic energy, the kinetic energy of a photon, may follow the following paths:

- be released again as a photon of less energy;
- be transferred to a recipient with no change in class;
- be dissipated as heat; or
- be transduced.

== See also ==
- Homeostasis
- Phosphate
- Pigments
- NAD
- ATP
- Cytochrome
