= French Group for the Study of Polymers and their Application =

Learned society promoting polymer science

GFP
- French group for the study of polymers and their application
- Groupe Français d’Études et d’Applications des Polymères
- Formation: 1970
- Founder: Georges Champetier; André J. Kovacs
- Type: Learned society
- Headquarters: Strasbourg
- Location: France
- Fields: polymer chemistry polymer physics
- Official language: French
- Secretary General: Madeline Vauthier
- President: René Saint-Loup
- Affiliations: Fédération française des matériaux European Polymer Federation
- Website: http://gfp.asso.fr/

The French group for the study of polymers and their application, also called more simply French polymer group (GFP) is a French nonprofit organization and learned society, which aims to promote polymer chemistry, physics, and material science in French industry and institutes of higher learning.

== History ==
=== Creation of the GFP ===
The GFP was created in 1970 by the polymer physicist André Kovacs and the chemist Georges Champetier, one of the first researchers in France to study polymer science. The statutes of the GFP set out the following goals:

- the advancement and dissemination of studies on macromolecular substances,
- the grouping of researchers studying polymers in order to promote exchanges of ideas and facilitate knowledge of scientific and technical progress in this field,
- the development of relationships between basic research and its applications.

The GFP is based in Strasbourg, where in 1954 the physicist Charles Sadron founded the first CNRS laboratory dedicated to polymer science, which became the Institut Charles Sadron in 1985. Its first general meeting was held on November 26–27, 1970 in Paris. Its first committee comprised Georges Champetier (President), Charles Sadron and René Riou (Vice-presidents), André Kovacs (Secretary general) and Constant Wippler (Treasurer). Since its founding, the presidency of the GFP has alternated between researchers based in academia and industry, while the secretary has always been a member of the Institut Charles Sadron (originally the CRM).

=== Sister societies and federations ===
In May 1990, the GFP reached an agreement with the Société chimique de France, becoming its Division of "Polymeric materials and elastomers". In 2001 this agreement was modified to create a "Polymer and Materials Chemistry" Division that was common to the two societies. In 2002, a similar agreement with the Société française de physique created a common "Polymer" Division between the two organizations. The GFP is a founding member of the Fédération française des matériaux (French Materials Federation), and a member of the European Polymer Federation, whose first conference was organized by the GFP in Lyon in 1986. In 2020, the GFP signed a Memorandum of Understanding with the Society of Polymer Science Japan.

== Activities ==
=== Conferences and Workshops ===
The GFP organizes numerous national and regional conferences and workshops. Its flagship event is the Colloque national du GFP, held each November in a different French city, with a typical attendance of 180-250 participants. In addition, the JEPO is an annual conference aimed at students and early career researchers, while the RNJP targets newly established researchers in permanent positions. Finally the GFP organizes regular workshops and training sessions on more specialized subjects.

=== Regional sections ===
The GFP comprises 7 regional sections, covering different geographical areas of France (Grand Ouest, Nord, Ile de France, Est, Rhône-Alpes-Auvergne, Méditerranée, Sud Ouest). Each section elects a president who participates in the Administrative Council of the GFP. Organisation of national events (the Colloque national and JEPO) rotates between the sections, while each section organises local events.

== Publications ==
The GFP publishes a newsletter "Actualités du GFP", 2-3 times per year. Additionally, its Education Commission periodically releases books on different aspects of polymers and their applications. In 2004, the GFP joined forces with the International Union for Pure and Applied Chemistry to promote education in polymer science in French-speaking countries.

== Awards and distinctions ==
The GFP bestows several annual or biennial awards, alone or jointly with the SCF or the SFP:

- Polymer Thesis Award of the Education Commission of the GFP (annual)
- Polymer Division Award, jointly awarded with the SCF, recognizing an early career scientist (less than 40 years old) for significant scientific results or original techniques in polymer chemistry (biennial, since 1992)
- Polymer Division Award, jointly awarded with the SFP, recognizing an early career scientist (less than 40 years old) for significant scientific results or original techniques in polymer physics (biennial, since 2004)
- Grand Prix of the GFP, recognizing the career or the complete works of a French or international researcher in polymer science (biennial, since 2003)
- Prix d'Honneur of the GFP, recognizing a scientific career dedicated to polymer science (annual, since 2017)

== Presidents and secretaries general ==
President		Secretary general	
René Saint-Loup	2026-	Madeline Vauthier	2026-
Vincent Monteil	2023-2026	Olivier Sandre	2025-2026
Vincent Monteil	2023-2026	Fanny Bonnet	2023-2025
Gustavo S. Luengo	2021-2023	Delphine Chan-Seng	2020-2023
Sophie Guillaume	2018-2021	Delphine Chan-Seng	2020-2023
Jean-Marc Pujol	2016-2018	Michel Bouquey	2015-2020
Jean-François Gérard	2013-2015	Yves Holl	2010-2015
Michel Glotin	2010-2012	Yves Holl	2010-2015
Yves Gnanou	2007-2009	Jean-Michel Guenet	2009-2010
Pascal Barthélémy	2004-2006	Pierre Lutz	2005-2009
Jean-Pierre Pascault	2001-2003	Claude Mathis	2000-2005
François Erard	1998-2000	Léonard Reibel	1995-2000
Jean-Pierre Vairon	1995-1997	Léonard Reibel	1995-2000
Bernard Sillion	1992-1994	Emile Franta	1989-1995
Ernest Maréchal	1989-1991	Emile Franta	1989-1995
Jean Minoux	1986-1988	Jean Brossa	1986-1989
Jean-Baptiste Donnet	1983-1985	Bernard Lotz	1980-1986
Emile Bouchez	1980-1982	Paul Rempp	1974-1980
Adolphe Chapiro	1978-1979	Paul Rempp	1974-1980
Bernard Besançon	1977	Paul Rempp	1974-1980
Georges Champetier	1970-1976	André Kovacs	1970-1974
