= Bourke Award =

The Bourke Award of the Royal Society of Chemistry is an annual prize open to academics from outside the UK. Originally established by the Faraday Society and known as the Bourke Lectures, the award of £2000 enables experts in physical chemistry or chemical physics to present their work in the UK. The winner also receives a commemorative medal.

In 2020 the Bourke Award was merged with the Liversidge Award to create the Bourke-Liversidge Award.

== Winners ==
Year	Recipient
2020	Sharon Hammes-Schiffer
2019	David Beratan
2018	Daniel M. Neumark
2017	Kieron Burke
2016	Laura Gagliardi
2015	Lyndon Emsley
2014	Ann McDermott
2013	Bert Weckhuysen
2012	Gregory D. Scholes
2011	Mark Ratner
2010	Michael T. Bowers
2009	Gerard J. M. Meijer
2008-09	Thomas R. Rizzo
2008	Ole G. Mouritsen
2007	George C. Schatz
2006	Christian Amatore
2005	Marsha I. Lester
2004	Paul D. Lett
2003	David A. Andelman
2002	David J. Nesbitt
2001	Ewine van Dishoeck
2000	Curt Wittig
1999	Daan Frenkel
1998	Terry A. Miller
1997	Rutger van Santen
1996	Kenneth C. Showalter
1995	Stephen Leone
1994	Dieter M. Kolb
1993	Henk Lekkerkerker
1992	Richard J. Saykally
1991	Gerhard Ertl
1990	Keiji Morokuma
1989	Donald H. Levy
1988	Alexander Pines
1987	Martin Quack
1986	Lucien Monnerie
1985	David Chandler
1984	Vladimir Ponec
1983	Eizi Hirota
1982	E. C. M. Clementi
1981	Robin M. Hochstrasser
1980	Adriano Zecchina
1979	Ora Kedem
1978	Antoni Dymanus
1977	Roy G. Gordon
1976	Pierre-Gilles de Gennes
1975	P Pimental [sic]
1974	Joshua Jortner
1973	Bogdan Baranowski
1972	Ilya Prigogine
1971	H Wolf
1970	E. Ulrich Franck
1968/69	William Klemperer
1967	Dudley R. Herschbach
1967	G. Wilse Robinson
1966	S Sadron [sic], Harden M. McConnell
1965	Heinz Gerischer
1964	Stuart A. Rice
1963	Alfonso Maria Liquori, Victor Talrose
1962	Manfred Eigen
1962	Joan van der Waals
1961	Harold S. Johnston
1960	Harold J. Bernstein
1960	A Perterlin [sic]
1959	Robert Gomer
1959	V. V. Voevodsky
1958	Walter H. Stockmayer
1958	Robert Harold Stokes
1957	Arend Joan Rutgers
1957	Wilhelm Jost
1956	Jan J. Hermans
1955	Donald Hornig

== See also ==
- List of chemistry awards
