= Pierre Douzou =

French biochemist (1926-2000)

- Born: August 25, 1926; Millau, Aveyron, France
- Died: June 9, 2000 (aged 73); Millau, Aveyron, France
- Education: École de santé des armées University of Paris
- Known for: cryobiology
- Scientific career
- Institutions: Muséum national d'histoire naturelle INSERM; Val-de-Grâce; INRA

Pierre Douzou (August 25, 1926 – June 9, 2000) was a French biochemist and a pioneer in cryobiology who led parallel scientific careers in both civic and military institutions. He founded the field of cryoenzymology and developed antifreeze solvents, which found particularly use in agronomy. Douzou is recognized worldwide for his work in the physical chemistry of biological reactions at low temperatures. Besides his scientific research, he was a promoter of original research at the intersection between the inanimate and the living and participated in France's scientific policymaking for several decades.

== Education and career ==
Douzou was born in Millau as the son of the glover Gaston Douzou. After studying at the Rodez high school, Douzou studied pharmacy at the École de santé des armées in Toulon in 1951 and later in Lyon. In 1953, Douzou entered the University of Paris and conducted research at the Radium institute (later Curie Institute) under the supervision of Moïse Haïssinsky. He completed his doctoral thesis in 1958 and was appointed a lecturer at the Muséum national d'histoire naturelle by Charles Sadron in the same year. During this period, Douzou was also a biologist since 1959 and an associate researcher (maître de recherche) at the French Armed Forces Health Service in 1965. This period saw him working at the Val-de-Grâce army hospital in Paris. Douzou left the museum in 1966 and joined the Institut de biologie physico-chimique, where he was starting to establish the biospectroscopy department. Douzou worked at the École pratique des hautes études from 1971 to 1977 as the director of the laboratory for macromolecular biology.

In 1974, Douzou joined INSERM and established the research unit 128, cryobiology applied to the study of metabolism (Cryobiologie appliquée à l'étude de métabolismes), from 1974 to 1980, which was based in Montpellier. In 1977, he was also director of the Institut de biologie physico-chimique in Paris and was appointed a professor at the Muséum national d'histoire naturelle to succeed Charles Sadron, a position he held until his retirement in 1995. His monograph on cryobiochemistry, published in 1977, summarizes the efforts made in along with colleagues such as Claude Balny and Gaston Hui Bon Hoa. From 1987 to 1994, Douzou was director of the research unit on Molecular and cellular biology at low temperatures at the Curie Institute in Paris. From 1989 to 1991, Douzou was also director of INRA. From 1985 to 1993, Douzou, along with Gilbert Durand and Philippe Kourilsky, coordinated the national biotechnology program at the Ministry of Research and Technology (ministère de la Recherche et de la Technologie).

== Bibliography ==
- Douzou, Pierre (1977). Cryobiochemistry: an introduction. London; New York: Academic Press. ISBN 9780122210501.
- Douzou, Pierre (1984). Le chaud et le froid: les conflits du vivant (in French). Paris: Fayard. ISBN 9782213013954.
- Douzou, Pierre (1985). Les bricoleurs du septième jour: nouveaux regards entomologiques (in French). Paris: Fayard. ISBN 9782213015866.
- Douzou, Pierre (1994). Vous cherchez quoi au juste? (in French). Odile Jacob. ISBN 978-2-7381-0260-7.
- Douzou, Pierre (1996). La Saga des gènes racontée aux jeunes (in French). Odile Jacob. ISBN 978-2-7381-6077-5.
- Douzou, Pierre; Durand, Gilbert; Siclet, Gérard (2001). Les biotechnologies (in French). Presses Universitaires de France. ISBN 978-2-13-051123-6.
