= IPHC =

IPHC may refer to:

- Institut pluridisciplinaire Hubert Curien
- International Pacific Halibut Commission
- Intellectual Property High Court of Japan
- Intraperitoneal hyperthermic chemoperfusion
- International Pentecostal Holiness Church
- International Pentecostal Holiness Church of Africa
