= Ramakrishna V. Hosur =

Indian biophysical scientist (born 1953)

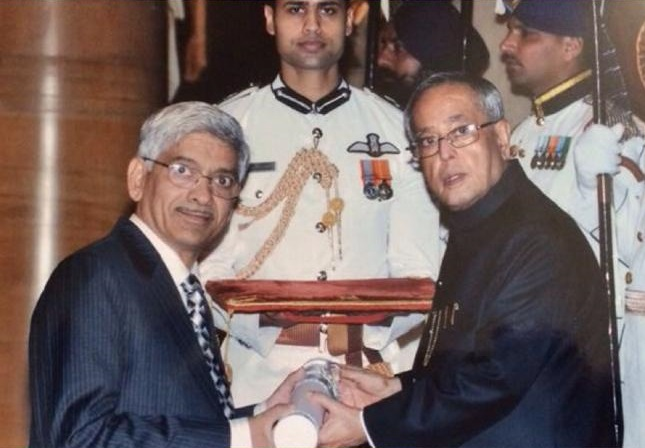
- Professor Hosur receiving the Padma Shri Award from President of India Pranab Mukherjee in 2014
- Born: 16 May 1953 (age 72); India
- Occupation: Biophysical scientist
- Spouse: Medhavini Hosur
- Children: Pavan Hosur(son); Kirti Hosur Rai(daughter)
- Awards: Padma Shri; Bruker Young Scientist Award; INSA Young Scientist Medal; B. M. Birla Award; Society for Cancer Research Award; J. C. Bose National Fellowship; Prof. G. N. Ramachandran Gold Medal; Acharya Prafulla Chandra Ray Memorial Award; Fellow of International Society of Magnetic Resonance

Professor Ramakrishna Vijayacharya Hosur is an Indian biophysical scientist, known for his expertise in the areas of nuclear magnetic resonance and molecular biophysics. The Government of India honoured him, in 2014, by awarding him the Padma Shri, the fourth highest civilian award, for his contributions to the fields of science and technology.

== Biography ==
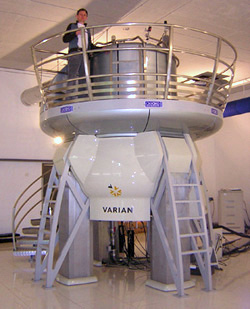
A 900MHz NMR instrument with a 21.1 T magnet

Ramakrishna Vijayacharya Hosur was born in the South Indian state of Karnataka on 16 May 1953. He graduated with chemistry, Physics and Maths as optional subjects in 1971 securing the 5th rank from Karnatak University and did his masters in Chemistry, MSc, from the Indian Institute of Technology, Mumbai (IIT-B) with third rank, in 1973. This was followed by a PhD from the Tata Institute of Fundamental Research (TIFR), Mumbai in 1978.

Hosur started his career by joining TIFR as a Research Associate in August 1978 and was promoted as a TIFR Fellow in 1980, a status he maintained till 1986. In between, in 1981, he took a long leave of two years from the institute and did post doctoral research at the ETH Zurich where he worked in the company of Professor Richard R. Ernst and Professor Kurt Wuthrich, who would eventually win Nobel Prize in 1991 and 2002 respectively. In 1986, Hosur rejoined TIFR in the post of the Reader. Five years later, he was promoted as the Associate Professor and then as the Professor in 1996. Hosur is the Senior Professor at the Tata Institute since 2003 in the Department of Chemical Sciences. Professor Hosur has also worked at the Columbia University, New York, at Professor D. J. Patel's laboratory for three months (20 August - 20 November) in 1988. During his TIFR career, Hosur is reported to have been active in the administration of the institute by holding the chair of the Department of Chemical Sciences, Advisory Committee for Administration and Finance, and the Standing Committee on Administration for various tenures. He was also the Vigilance Officer of the institute from 2002 till 2004 and is the Convener for the National Facility for High Field Nuclear Magnetic Resonance since 2002 till date.

Ramakrishna Hosur is married and has two children and the family lives in Mumbai.

== Legacy ==
Hosur has taught at the Tata Institute of Fundamental Research, Indian Institute of Technology Mumbai and National Institute of Technology Rourkela on nuclear magnetic resonance and is credited with pioneering research on biomolecular nuclear magnetic resonance, molecular biophysics, and biophysical chemistry at these institutions. The efforts of Dr. Hosur has led to the discovery of new structural motifs in quadruplex DNA structures; A-tetrad, T-tetrad and C-tetrad and the development of new multidimensional NMR pulse sequences. He is reported to have explained the folding hierarchy in HIV-1 protease,

the native state energy landscape, and structural and dynamic characteristics of SUMO-1 protein along the equilibrium folding pathways

and also shown experimentally that the progress of the native contacts is not monotonous. Hosur is reported to have developed a new NMR based theoretical model which is said to be of assistance in the structural studies on proteases. He has also developed scaling techniques for the enhancement of resolution and sensitivity and proposed what Indian Academy of Sciences quotes as:

a pH switch mechanism for cargo trafficking by DLC8 protein inside living cells.

Hosur has delivered keynote addresses at various international conferences and has lectured at many international institutions. He has also taken part in organizing many international conferences. He has also guided many students in their doctoral research.

Hosur is credited with 3 books of which two as editor, three book reviews, three technical reports and over 150 articles, published in national and international peer reviewed journals. The US National Library of Medicine has listed 112 articles by Dr. Hosur in their online repository.

- BEST-HNN and 2D (HN)NH experiments for rapid backbone assignment in proteins
- NMR insights into the core of GED assembly by H/D exchange coupled with DMSO dissociation and analysis of the denatured state
- Visualization of early events in acetic acid denaturation of HIV-1 protease: A molecular dynamics study
- AUTOBA: Automation of Backbone Assignment from HN(C)N Suite of Experiments
- NMR derived Model of GED self association: relevance to dynamin assembly

== Positions ==
Hosur is life member of Indian Biophysical Society, Indian Science Congress Association, Society for Biological Chemists, India and the Chemical Research Society of India. He is a member of the International Society of Magnetic Resonance, the Society for Cancer Research and Communication, Mumbai and American Chemical Society. He has led, in the capacity of the President, such organizations as Indian Biophysical Society, New Biology Section of the Indian Science Congress, and the National Magnetic Resonance Society. He has also served as the council member of Chemical Research Society of India, ICMRBS, Centre for Biomedical Magnetic Resonance, Research Council of IICB, Kolkata, INSA, NASI, and ISCA.

Hosur, founder and life member of the National Magnetic Resonance Society, is a reviewer for international journals such as International Journal of Quantum Chemistry, Journal of Biomolecular NMR and Biochemistry USA and a reviewer for proposals of grant of international funding agencies viz. Wellcome Trust, UK, Erwin Schrodinger Fellowship, Indo Swiss and Indo French collaborative projects and Austrian Science Foundation. He is also an examiner for the award of PhD at the Indian Institutes of Technology, Bangalore, Mumbai and Delhi.

Prof. Hosur has been appointed as a distinguished visiting professor in the Department of Biosciences and Bioengineering in IIT Bombay from 4 September 2018.

== Awards and recognitions ==
Hosur has been honored by many scientific and academic institutions by way of fellowships and associateships. He was a Young Associate of the Indian Academy of Sciences during 1985-88. He is Fellow of the Indian Academy of Sciences (FASc), Indian National Science Academy (FNA), National Academy of Sciences (FNASc) and The Academy of Sciences for the Developing World (TWAS). He has also been awarded Oration awards such as B. D. Tilak Lecture Award of Bombay University in 1989, R. K. Asundi Lecture Award of Indian National Science Academy in 1998, Dr. Jagdish Shankar Lecture Award of Indian National Science Academy in 2003, IICB Foundation Day lecture Award of Indian Institute of Chemical Biology, Kolkata in 2004, RRL Foundation Day lecture of Regional Research Laboratory, Trivandrum in 2006 and Fr. Yeddanapalli Memorial lecture of Indian Chemical Society in 2009.

Known as an efficient lecturer and honored by the Honorary Mention at the International Summer School on Quantum Chemistry held at Uppsala, Sweden during August–September, 1975, Dr. Hosur is a recipient of several awards such as:

- Young Scientist Award - Bruker Corporation - 1983
- Young Scientist Medal - Indian National Science Academy - 1984
- B. M. Birla Award - Birla Science Centre - 1992
- 3rd Annual Award - Society for Cancer Research - 1998
- J. C Bose National Fellowship - Department of Science and Technology, Government of India - 2007
- Prof. G. N. Ramachandran Gold Medal - Council for Scientific and Industrial Research - 2009
- Acharya Prafulla Chandra Ray Memorial Award - Indian Chemical Society - 2011
- Fellow of International Society of Magnetic Resonance (ISMAR) (2013)

The Government of India honored Ramakrishna Hosur with the Padma Shri by including him in the 2014 Republic Day Honours.

== See also ==
- Nuclear magnetic resonance spectroscopy
- Tata Institute of Fundamental Research
