= Yurii Vlasov =

American engineering professor (born 1964)

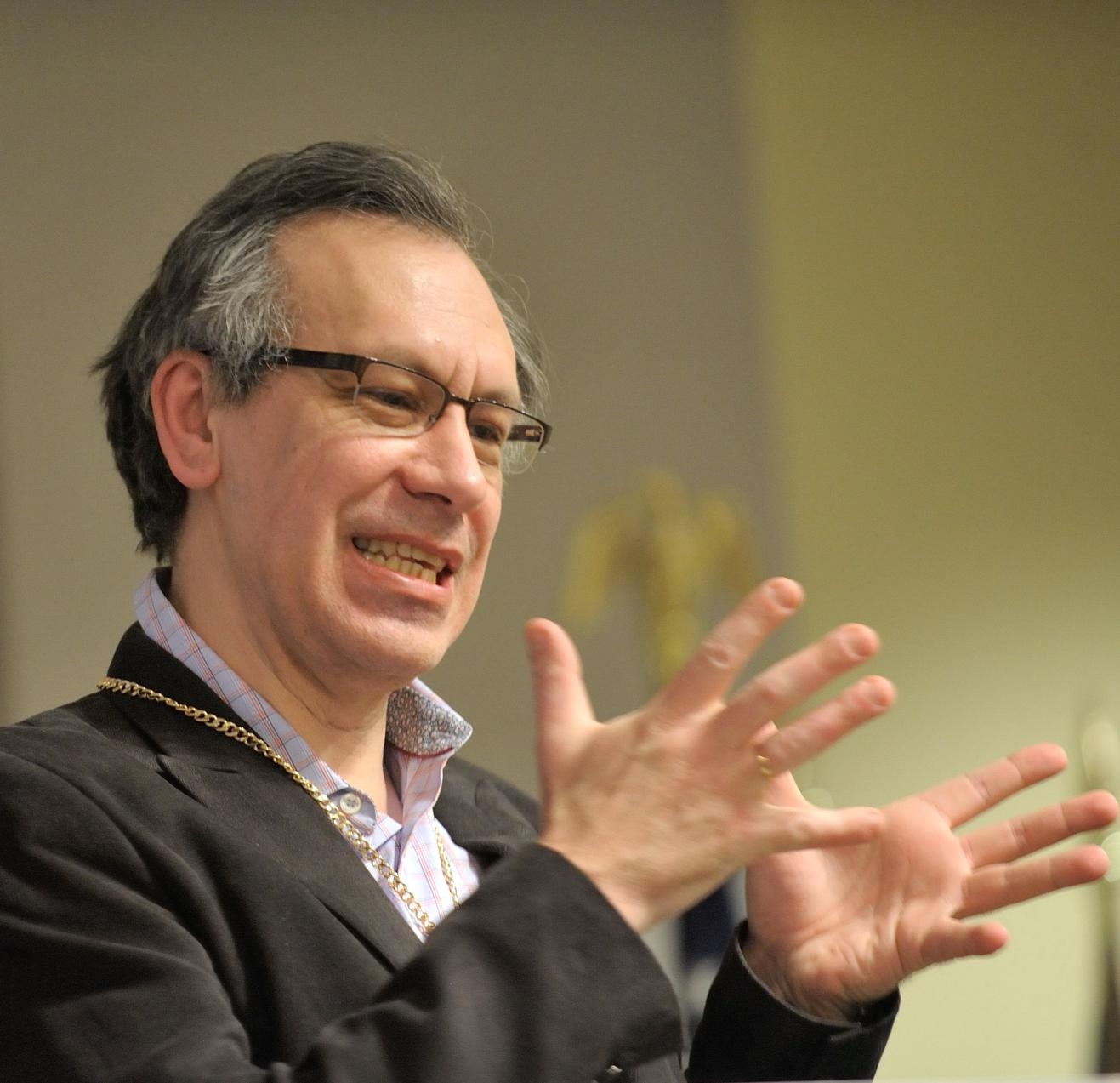
- Born: St.Petersburg, Russia
- Education: Saint Petersburg State University
- Scientific career
- Fields: Optics; Photonics; Nanotechnology
- Workplaces: University of Illinois Urbana-Champaign; IBM T.J.Watson Research Center; Janelia Research Campus; NEC Research Institute; Strasbourg Institute of Material Physics and Chemistry; Ioffe Institute of Physics and Technology
- Website: www.integratedneurotech.com

Yurii Vlasov (born 1964) is a John Bardeen Endowed Chair in Electrical and Computer Engineering and Physics at the University of Illinois Urbana–Champaign (UIUC).

Vlasov earned his M.S. University of St.-Petersburg, Russia in 1988 and Ph.D. from the Ioffe Institute of Physics and Technology, St.-Petersburg, Russia in 1995.

Prior to joining UIUC in 2016, Vlasov held various positions at the IBM T. J. Watson Research Center. In 2001-2015 he led company-wide efforts in integrated silicon nanophotonics and more recently in neuromorphic computing architectures.

Vlasov is a scholar of nanophotonics and an industrial engineer. He led the transition from basic scientific knowledge about nanophotonics (TRL level 1–2) to real-world manufacturable (TRL level 8–9) silicon nanophotonics technology.

The CMOS9WG technology developed under the leadership of Vlasov at IBM and lately deployed at GlobalFoundries is enabling high-performance optical connectivity in supercomputers, data centers, metro, and long-haul communications, while significantly reducing cost and maximizing energy efficiency.

== Recognition ==
Vlasov has been elected to the National Academy of Engineering in 2021, for "contributions to development and commercialization of silicon photonics for optical data communications". He has also been elected a Fellow of Optical Society of America in 2007, a Fellow of American Physical Society in 2007, and a Fellow of Institute of Electrical and Electronics Engineers in 2015 for his contributions to nanophotonics including photonic crystals and silicon photonics.
