= Carbonyl olefin metathesis =

Chemical reaction

Carbonyl olefin metathesis is a type of metathesis reaction that entails, formally, the redistribution of fragments of an alkene and a carbonyl by the scission and regeneration of carbon-carbon and carbon-oxygen double bonds respectively. It could be a powerful method in organic synthesis. The main challenge is that no catalytic reaction has been demonstrated.

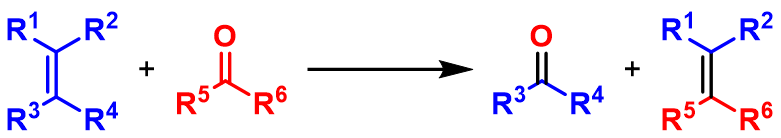

== Photochemical conditions ==
The carbonyl–olefin metathesis reaction can proceed stepwise under photochemical conditions, where in the first step irradiation induces a [2+2] cycloaddition between a carbonyl and olefin, known as the Paternò–Büchi reaction. The isolated oxetane intermediate can subsequently be fragmented into a new carbonyl and olefin product under thermal or acidic conditions.

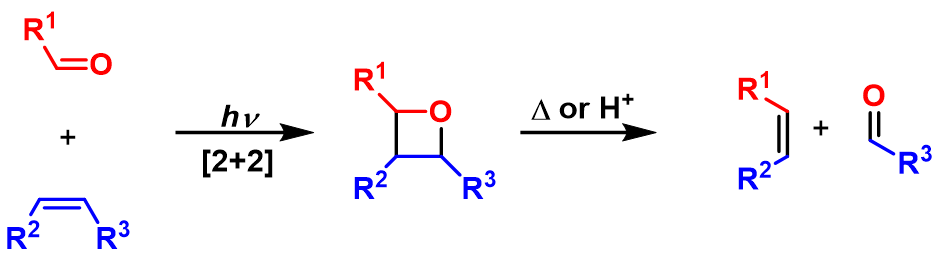

== Metal-mediated process ==
The metal-mediated processes include a carbonyl-olefination and an olefin–olefin metathesis event. There are two general schemes: one, reaction of a [M=CHR^{1}] reagent with an alkene to generate a new metal alkylidene, which then couples with a carbonyl group to form the desired substituted alkene and an inactive [M=O] species (type A); two, conversion of the carbonyl moiety into an alkene through Wittig-type alkenylation, followed by metathesis between this newly formed alkene and a second alkene (type B). This transformation could be done in both stepwise (i.e. two-pot) or one-pot fashion.

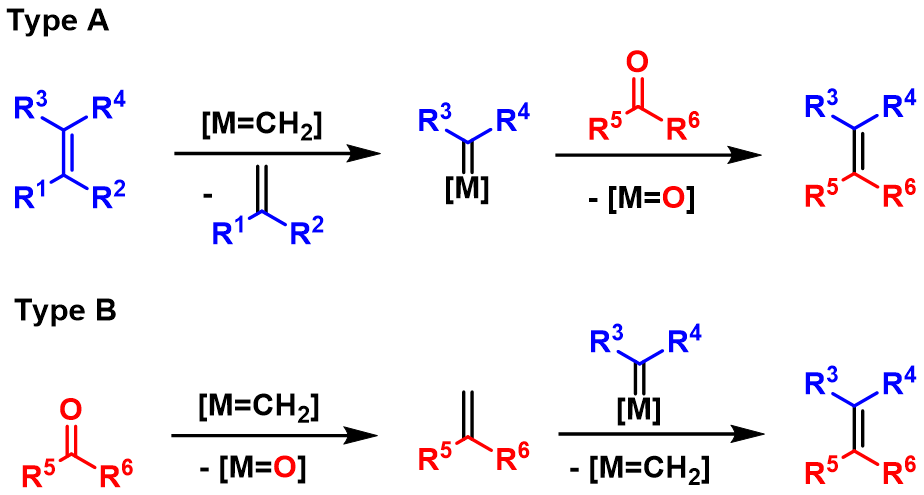

For Type A transformation, stoichiometric amount of molybdenum or tungsten complex was often used to generate the metal alkylidene intermediate. In Lei's total synthesis of Huperzine Q, they have furnished the cyclopentene ring through carbonyl-olefin metathesis using Schrock molybdenum alkylidene complex. As for Type B transformation, the alkene intermediate was usually formed through treating the carbonyl functional group with reagents like titanocene methylidene, Tebbe, Grubbs, Petasis reagents or in situ generated titanium alkylidenes. Keck and coworkers showcased the utility of in situ generated titanium alkylidene to perform carbonyl-olefin metathesis in their preparation of the C-ring fragment of bryostatin 1

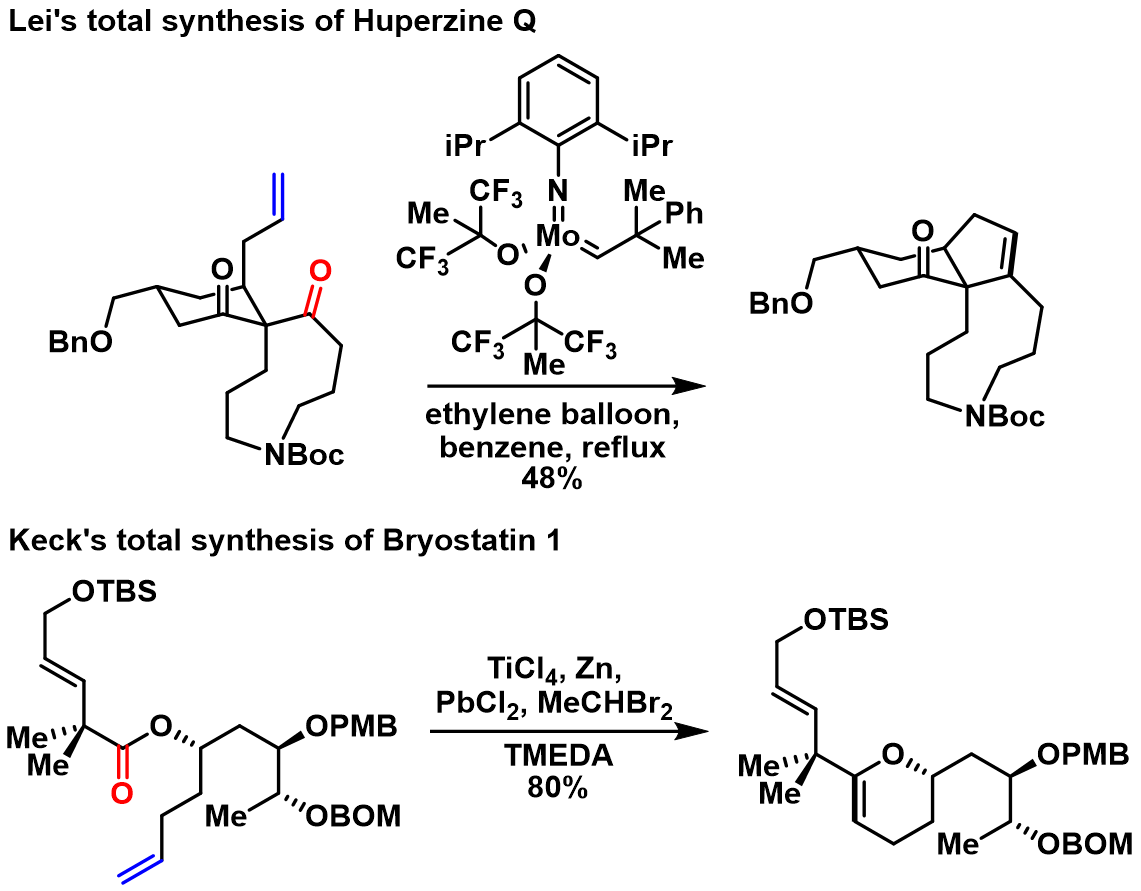

== Organocatalyzed process ==
=== Hydrazine mediated reactions ===
In 2012, the Lambert group has reported a ring-opening metathesis of cyclopropenes with aldehydes using a simple hydrazine catalyst through a [3+2]/ retro [3+2] cycloaddition sequence. A detailed mechanism for this metathesis process is described below: the catalytic cycle started with the condensation of aldehyde R^{1}CHO with hydrazine catalyst, and then the reactive intermediate underwent cycloaddition with cyclopropene. After proton transfer, retro-[3+2] took place which gave the desired hydrazonium intermediate. The subsequent hydrolysis liberates the metathesis product and regenerated catalyst. Cyclopropenes worked smoothly but norbornene and stilbene among other olefins did not undergo metathesis with aldehydes under the same conditions.

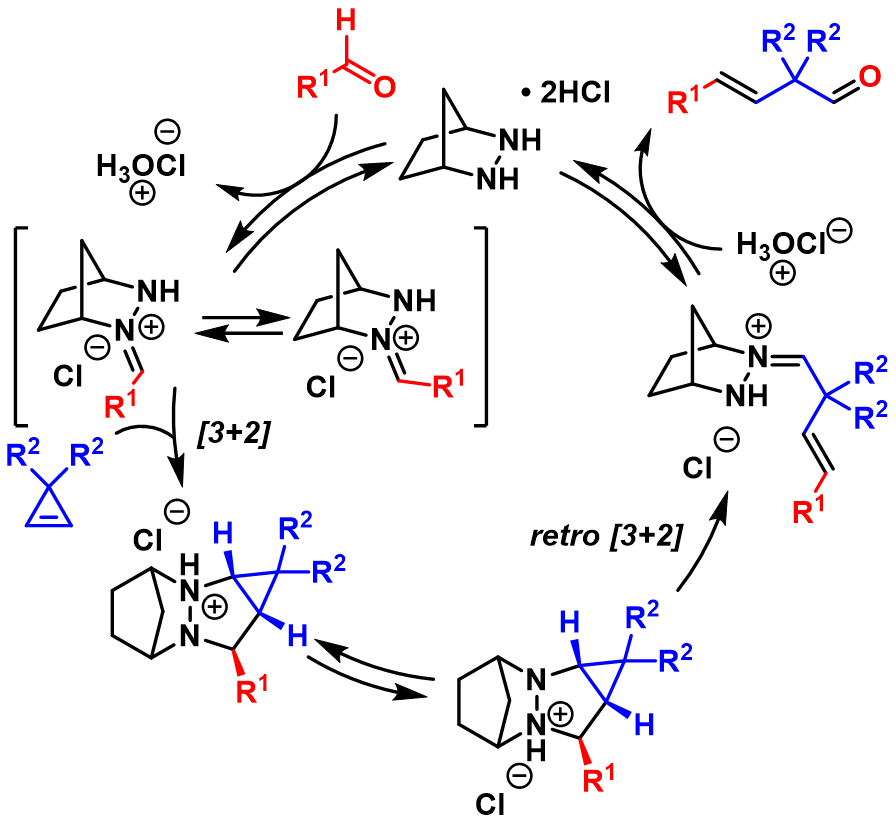

=== Lewis acid-mediated reactions ===
Back in 1971, Demole and co-workers has observed formation of oxetane from olefin and carbonyl through an intramolecular reaction mediated by SnCl_{4}. The authors has proposed a stepwise mechanism. Based on this result, several methods have been developed in intramolecular systems to form the alkene bond through the same oxetane intermediate followed by subsequent formal retro [2+2] reaction thus accomplishing a formal olefin carbonyl ring closing metathesis transformation. As for intermolecular version, Bickelhaupt and co-workers have observed carbonyl-olefin metathesis product in 15-30% yield from treating benzaldehyde and alkenes upon EPZ-10, a solid Lewis acid. This reaction system was further investigated and improved by Franzén group. They found that trityl cation catalyst could promote formal cross metathesis between trisubstituted alkenes and arenecarbaldehydes to give β-alkylstyrene and acetone. The proposed mechanism is shown below.

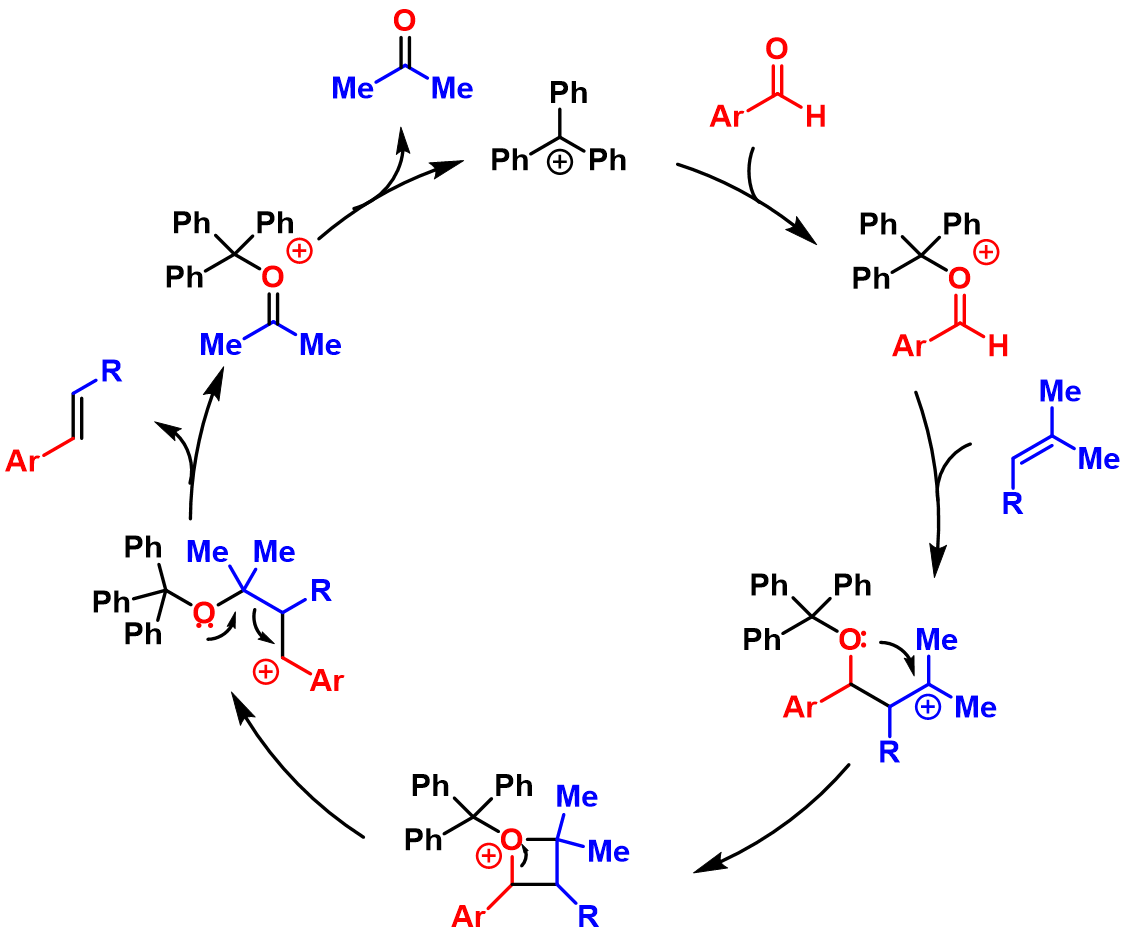
