= Emanuele Paternò =

Italian chemist

Emanuele Paternò di Sessa
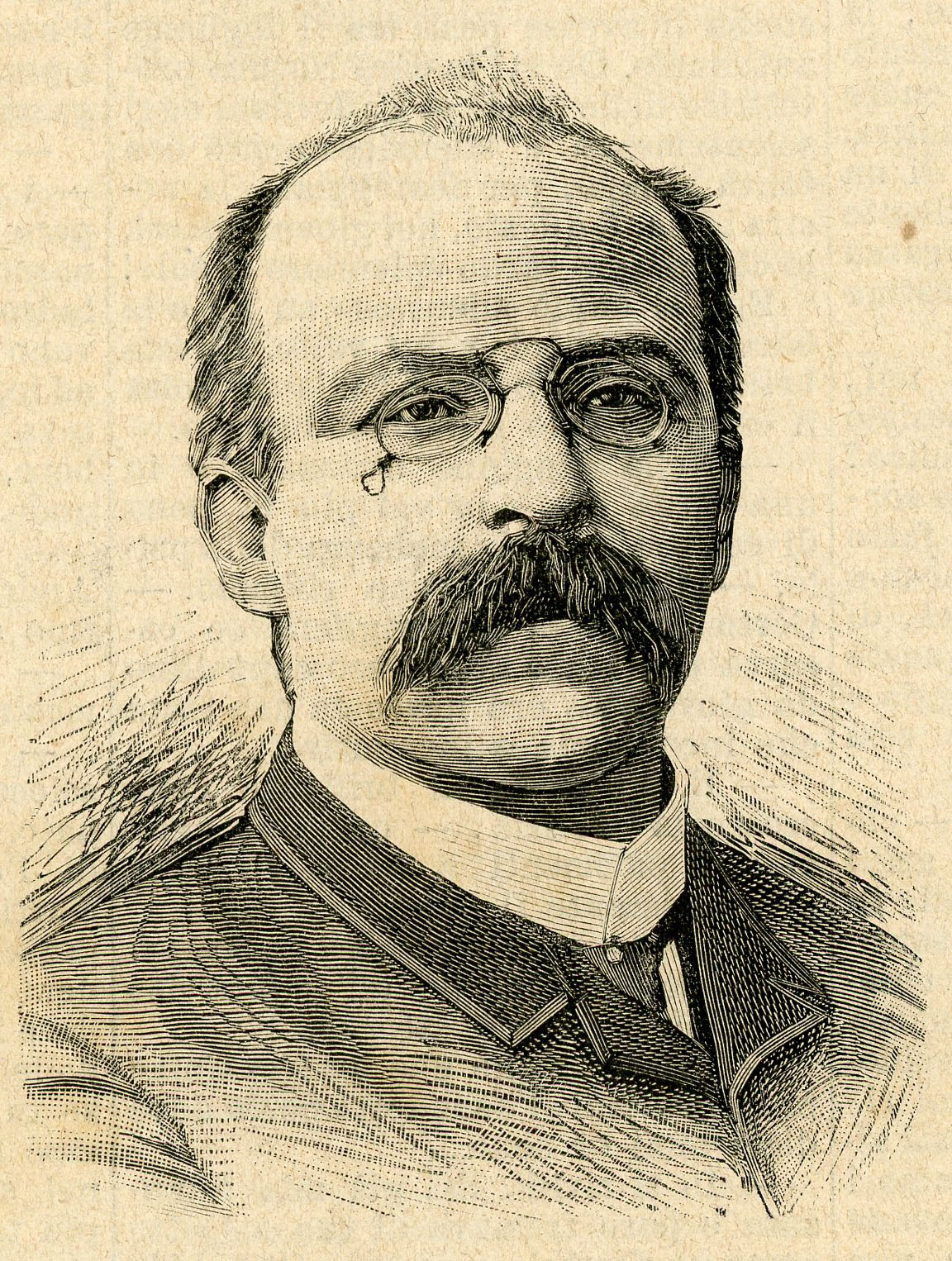
- Emanuele Paternò
- Born: 12 December 1847; Palermo, Kingdom of the Two Sicilies
- Died: 17 January 1935 (aged 87); Palermo
- Education: University of Palermo
- Known for: Paternò–Büchi reaction
- Scientific career
- Fields: Chemistry, Politics
- Workplaces: University of Palermo, University of Torino, University of Rome, University of Marburg
- Doctoral advisor: Stanislao Cannizzaro

President of the Accademia nazionale delle scienze
- In office 1 January 1921 – 26 March 1932
- Preceded by: Vito Volterra
- Succeeded by: Orso Mario Corbino

Emanuele Paternò, 9th Marquess of Sessa was an Italian chemist and politician and is credited with the discovery of the Paternò–Büchi reaction.

== Biography ==
He was born in Palermo in 1847 as the Marquess of Sessa, in a branch of the House of Paternò. Emanuele's father, Giuseppe, took part in the Sicilian Revolution of 1848. When the Bourbons returned to power, he was sentenced to exile, and much of his assets were confiscated. Paternò and his family moved to Alexandria, Egypt. There, in 1858, Giuseppe Paternò died, and Emanuele and his mother moved to Genoa where they were welcomed by Emanuele's uncle, also dedicated to the cause of Italian independence.

Following the Expedition of the Thousand, the Paternò family was able to return to Palermo. Emanuele enrolled the University of Palermo, where he studied chemistry with Stanislao Cannizzaro. He graduated in physics and chemistry In 1871.

== Scientific career ==
In 1871 he became a lecturer at the University of Torino, but returned to Palermo the following year as Cannizzaro's successor. In 1892 he became a professor at the University of Rome. His main area of research was photochemistry, and discovered the Paternò–Büchi reaction in 1909. The reaction was improved by George Büchi, its other namesake, in 1954.

== Political career ==
Paternò was politically active. He served as the Mayor of Palermo (1890–1892), and in 1890 he was appointed by King Victor Emmanuel III a member of the Senate of the Kingdom of Italy. He was later elected vice president (1904-1919) of the Italian upper house.

== Bibliography ==
- Calascibetta, Franco (2014). "PATERNO, Emanuele". Dizionario Biografico degli Italiani (in Italian). Vol. 81: Pansini–Pazienza. Rome: Istituto dell'Enciclopedia Italiana. ISBN 978-88-12-00032-6.
