= David Andelman =

David Andelman may refer to:

- David A. Andelman (born 1944), American journalist
- David Andelman (physicist) (born 1955), Israeli theoretical physicist
