= Katja Loos =

Dutch polymer chemist (born 1971)

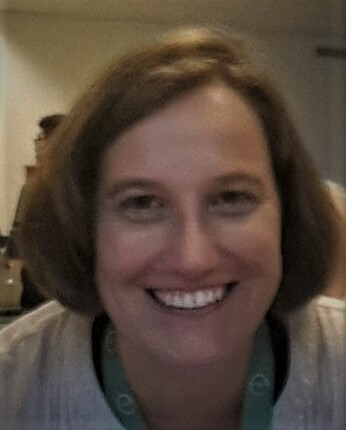
- Born: 1971 (age 54–55); Frankfurt am Main, Germany
- Education: Johannes Gutenberg Universität Mainz, Germany
- Known for: Enzymatic Polymerizations, Block Copolymers, Supramolecular Chemistry
- Scientific career
- Fields: Polymer chemistry, material science, applied chemistry
- Thesis: Hybridmaterialien mit Amylose durch enzymatische grafting from Polymerisation (2001)
- Doctoral advisor: Axel H. E. Müller, Reimund Stadler
- Website: www.rug.nl/research/polymer-chemistry

Katja Loos is professor at the Zernike Institute for Advanced Materials of the University of Groningen, The Netherlands holding the chair of Macromolecular Chemistry and New Polymeric Materials.

She served as the President of the European Polymer Federation (EPF) from 2023 to 2025.

== Biography ==
Katja Loos studied chemistry at the Johannes Gutenberg Universität in Mainz, Germany and graduated in 1996. During her graduate studies she focused her studies on Organic Chemistry and Polymer Chemistry. In 1992 and 1993 she was an international exchange student at the University of Massachusetts in Amherst, USA.

In 2001, she received her PhD in Macromolecular Chemistry from the University of Bayreuth, Germany. Her thesis was focused on hybrid materials bearing amylose using enzymatic polymerizations. During her PhD research she worked in 1997 as an international exchange researcher at the Universidade Federal do Rio Grande do Sul, Porto Alegre, Brazil.

In 2001, she received a Feodor Lynen research fellowship of the Alexander von Humboldt Foundation to conduct postdoctoral research at the Polytechnic University in Brooklyn, NY, USA, where she worked on fundamentals of self-assembled monolayers and immobilization supports for biocatalysts.

In 2003, she started an independent research group at the University of Groningen, the Netherlands.

Katja Loos worked as guest professor at the Technical University of Catalonia, Barcelona, Spain in 2006 and at the Technical University Dresden, Germany in 2016.

== Research ==
The research of Loos is focused on enzymatic polymerization, especially the biocatalytic synthesis of saccharides, polyamides and furan based polymers, as well as the synthesis and self-assembly of block copolymers using supramolecular motifs and containing ferroelectric blocks.

Loos published over 270 scholarly peer-reviewed publications, various patents and book chapters. Her publications frequently get included in special themed collections of scientific journals like "Women in Polymer Science" from Wiley en "Women at the Forefront of Chemistry" of the American Chemical Society

She is the editor of the only currently available textbook in the field of Enzymatic Polymerizations.

She is editor of the scientific journal Polymer and guest-edited special issues of various scientific journals.

From 2017 to 2024 she was a member of the board of the Zernike Institute for Advanced Materials of the University of Groningen (chair of the board from 2020 on). She serves as the vice-chair of the program council Chemistry of Advanced Materials of ChemistryNL, was a member of the board of the MaterialenNL Platform and is a member of the board of the Dutch national postgraduate research school Polymer Technology Netherlands (PTN).

Katja Loos is the national representative of the Netherlands to the European Polymer Federation (EPF).

In addition to her research, Katja Loos advocates for diversity in science and open access publishing

== Awards and honours ==
Katja Loos was awarded two travel scholarships of the German Academic Exchange Service (DAAD) for research stays at the University of Massachusetts in Amherst, USA, in 1992 and 1993 and at Universidade Federal do Rio Grande do Sul, Porto Alegre, Brasil, in 1997.

In 2001, she received a Feodor Lynen Fellowship award of the Alexander von Humboldt Foundation to conduct her postdoctoral research.

The Netherlands Organisation for Scientific Research (NWO) awarded her a VIDI innovational research grant in 2009 and a VICI innovational research grant in 2014

In 2016 the Technical University Dresden and the German Research Council (DFG) within the scope of its excellency initiative awarded her the Eleonore Trefftz guest professorship.

The Alexander von Humboldt Foundation awarded Katja Loos in 2019 the Friedrich Wilhelm Bessel Research Award.

In 2019, she was named "Topper of the year" by Science Guide.

She is one of the recipients of the IUPAC 2021 Distinguished Women in Chemistry or Chemical Engineering award.

In 2022 she won the Team Science Award of the Dutch Research Council (NWO) with her research group HyBRit.

In 2023 she received the title of Knight of the Order of the Netherlands Lion, the prestigious Dutch order of chivalry founded by King William I in 1815.

Katja Loos is a Fellow of the Dutch Polymer Institute (DPI) and the Royal Society of Chemistry (FRSC)
