= Luis M. Campos =

American organic materials chemist

Luis Miguel Campos
- Born: Guadalajara, Mexico
- Education: California State University, Dominguez Hills B.Sc. (2001); University of California, Los Angeles Ph.D. (2006)
- Scientific career
- Fields: Organic chemistry, Materials Chemistry
- Workplaces: Columbia University (2011-present); University of California, Santa Barbara (2006-2010)
- Thesis: [ProQuest 305343005 Light-Induced Processes in Organic Chemistry: Decarbonylations in Crystals, Quantum Tunneling, and Solar Cells] (2006)
- Doctoral advisor: Miguel García-Garibay and Kendall N. Houk
- Other academic advisors: H. Leonardo Martinez, Craig Hawker
- Website: www.somoscampos.org

Luis M. Campos is a professor in the Department of Chemistry at Columbia University. Campos leads a research team focused on nanostructured materials, macromolecular systems, and single-molecule electronics.

== Early life and career ==
Campos attended California State University, Dominguez Hills, graduating with a B.Sc. in chemistry in 2001. After completing his undergraduate degree, Campos conducted research at King’s College London on theoretical organic photochemistry

Campos attended the University of California, Los Angeles (UCLA) as a graduate student, where he worked under Prof. Miguel García-Garibay and Prof. Kendall Houk’s supervision. During his doctoral studies, Campos also performed research at the University of Minnesota with Prof. Donald G. Truhlar during the summer of 2003, and at the Johannes Kepler University Linz in Austria with Prof. Niyazi Serdar Sarıçiftçi in 2004 and 2005. Campos was awarded an NSF Predoctoral Fellowship, a Paul & Daisy Soros Fellowship, and the Saul & Silvia Winstein Award during his graduate studies. He received a Ph.D. from the Department of Chemistry and Biochemistry in 2006.

Campos then conducted postdoctoral research from 2006 to 2010 at the University of California, Santa Barbara, where he worked with polymer chemist Prof. Craig Hawker on functionalization and cross-linking of polymers using the thiol-ene reaction.

Campos has started his independent academic career in 2011 as an assistant professor in the Columbia University Department of Chemistry. In 2016, he was promoted to associate professor. In 2023, he was promoted to professor.

He has served as an associate editor of the journal Chemical Science since 2018.

== Research ==
=== Nanostructured materials ===
Nanostructured materials deal with block copolymers and assembles themselves. Campos and colleagues developed copolymers that can self-assemble into different nanoparticles

=== Molecular and macromolecular systems ===
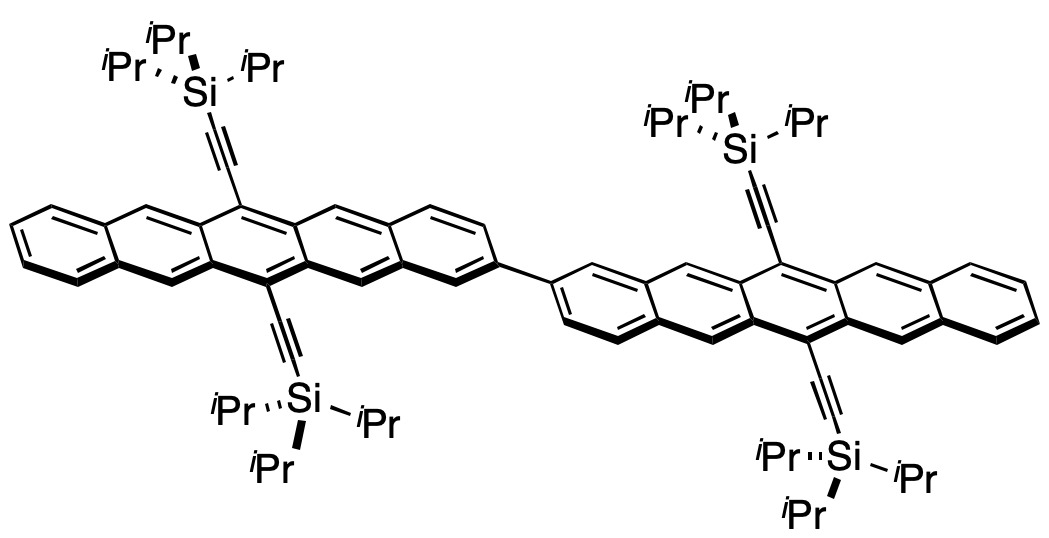
BP0, an organic molecule synthesized by Campos and coworkers in 2015 that exhibits intramolecular singlet fission.

Campos and colleagues also work on the development of chemistry for the next generation solar cell technologies.

=== Single-molecule electronics ===
Studies involving single-molecule transport demonstrate how particular designs lead the synthesis of macromolecular materials. This also allows for chemists to adjust the functionality of a chemical. This research allows for exceptional transport technology.

== Awards and honors ==
Campos has received the 2016 ACS Arthur C. Cope Scholar Award, 2016 C&E News Talented 12.
