= Nicholas Turro =

American chemist (1938–2012)

Nicholas J. Turro
- Born: May 18, 1938; Middletown, Connecticut, US
- Died: November 24, 2012 (aged 74)
- Education: Wesleyan University; California Institute of Technology
- Known for: Contribution to organic photochemistry
- Awards: Arthur C. Cope Award (2011); William H. Nichols Medal (2007); Willard Gibbs Award (2000); E. O. Lawrence Award (1982); ACS Award in Pure Chemistry (1974)
- Scientific career
- Fields: Chemist
- Workplaces: Columbia University
- Doctoral advisor: George S. Hammond
- Other academic advisors: Paul Doughty Bartlett
- Notable students: Jayaraman Sivaguru Miguel García-Garibay

Nicholas J. Turro (May 18, 1938 – November 24, 2012) was an American chemist, Wm. P. Schweitzer Professor of Chemistry at Columbia University. He was a world renowned organic chemist and leading world expert on organic photochemistry. He was the recipient of the 2011 Arthur C. Cope Award in Organic Chemistry, given annually "to recognize outstanding achievement in the field of organic chemistry, the significance of which has become apparent within the five years preceding the year in which the award will be considered." He was also the recipient of the 2000 Willard Gibbs Award, which recognizes "eminent chemists who...have brought to the world developments that enable everyone to live more comfortably and to understand this world better."

He received his B.A. degree summa cum laude from Wesleyan University in 1960. He attended graduate school at Caltech where he received his Ph.D. degree with George S. Hammond in 1963. Following a postdoctoral year at Harvard with P. D. Bartlett, he joined the faculty at Columbia University where he was the Wm. P. Schweitzer Professor of Chemistry.

Although he worked in many areas of chemistry, he was most well known for his work in photochemistry and spectroscopy, which he applied to studies involving small molecules in solution, interfaces, thin films, polymers, biological systems including DNA and carbohydrates, nanomaterials, supramolecular and "super-duper" molecular systems. His success in these areas is evident by his co-authorship of over 1000 papers. His expertise in photochemistry, spectroscopy and organic chemistry lead to a large network of international collaborators, including Fortune 500 companies such as Procter and Gamble.

He authored the influential books Molecular Photochemistry published in 1965, considered the "bible" of the field for several generations by organic photochemists, and Modern Molecular Photochemistry published in 1978. The latter was comprehensively revised as Principles of Molecular Photochemistry: An Introduction in 2008 and later as Modern Molecular Photochemistry of Organic Molecules in 2010 both of which were co-authored with V. Ramamurthy at University of Miami and J.C. Scaiano at the University of Ottawa. Turro has been selected as one of the most highly cited chemists for the past two decades, and has published over 900 research papers. He was a member of both the National Academy of Sciences and the American Academy of Arts and Sciences.
