= Scheffold =

Scheffold is a German surname. Notable people with the surname include:

- Frank Scheffold (born 1969), German physicist
- Maria Scheffold (1912–1970), German chess master
