= Raymond Fuoss =

American chemist

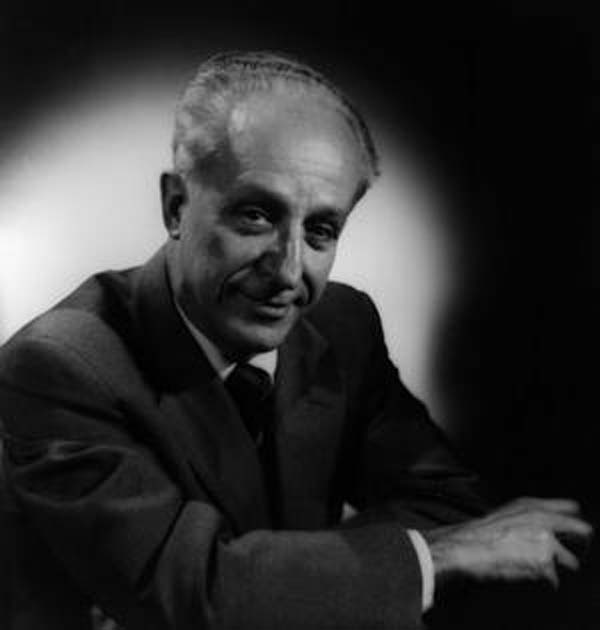
- Born: September 28, 1905; Bellwood, Pennsylvania, USA
- Died: December 1, 1987 (aged 82)
- Spouse(s): Rose Elizabeth Harrington (divorced) Ann Stein Fuoss (m. 1947–1979)
- Children: 2

Academic background
- Education: BA., Harvard University (summa cum laude); PhD., Chemistry, 1932, Brown University
- Thesis: Influence of the solvent medium on the conductance of electrolytes, (1932)
- Doctoral advisor: Lars Onsager

Academic work
- Sub-discipline: Electrolytic conductance
- Institutions: Yale University

Raymond Matthew Fuoss (28 September 1905 – 1 December 1987) was an American chemist who researched mainly on electrolytes, polyelectrolytes, and polymers. He held Sterling Professor status at Yale University.

== Early life and education ==
Fuoss was born to Jacob Z. Fuoss in 1905 and graduated from Altoona High School.

After graduating summa cum laude from Harvard University, Fuoss accepted a Sheldon Fellowship to study at the Ludwig-Maximilians-Universität München. He began his graduate studies at Brown University in 1930, after various teaching positions.

== Career ==
From 1932 to 1933, Fuoss was a research instructor at Brown University, before being promoted to assistant professor for research from 1933 until 1936. While at Brown, Fuoss was the recipient of the ACS Award in Pure Chemistry. The award came with a monetary prize of $1000 for his achievement of producing the "first comprehensive theory of electrolytic solutions." Due to limited financial resources for university research during the Great Depression in the mid-1930s, Fuoss was contacted by the General Electric Research Laboratory, where he worked until the end of the Second World War. In 1945 he went to Yale University, where he was appointed a Sterling Professor Chair of Chemistry. In 1951, Fuoss was elected to the National Academy of Sciences and later, in 1954, was elected chairman of the American Chemical society's division of Polymer Chemistry.

Fuoss eventually retired from Yale University in 1974 but continued active research in electrolytes.
