= Jayaraman Sivaguru =

- Sivaguru Jayaraman
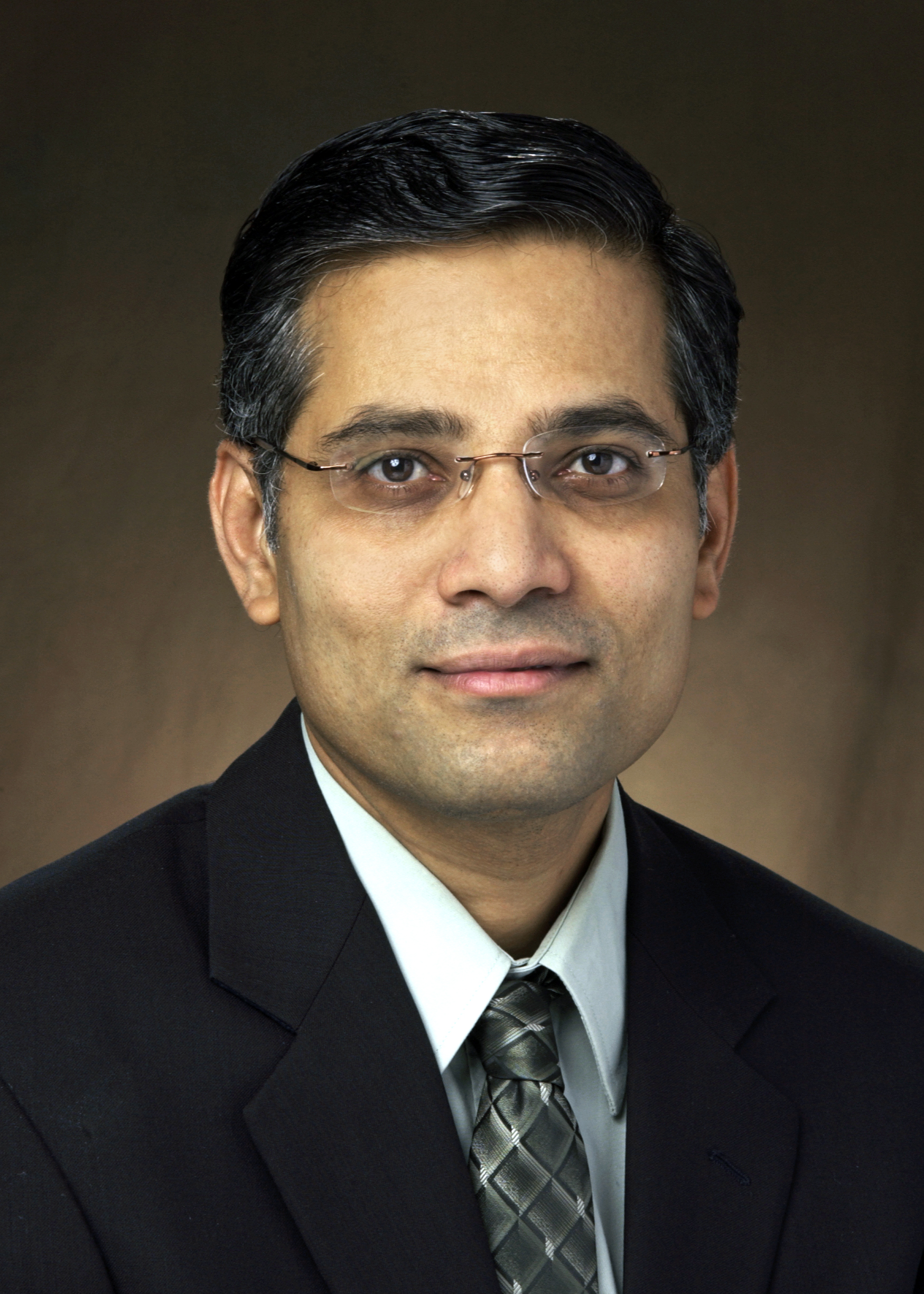
- Other names: Siva, Sivaguru Jayaraman
- Education: Columbia University, Tulane University, Indian Institute of Technology, Madras
- Known for: Developing new photoreactions, organophotocatalysis, supramolecular photocatalysis, photodegradable and recyclable polymers
- Awards: Grammaticakis-Neumann Prize - Swiss Chemical Society, National Science Foundation CAREER award, Inter-American Photochemical Society Young Investigator award, Sigma Xi Young Investigator award, Honda-Fujishima Lectureship Award from the Japanese Photochemical Society, 2025 Probost Lectureship, 2025 Nehru-Fulbright Fellowship, 2027 Chemical Research Society of India Medal.
- Scientific career
- Academic advisors: Nicholas J. Turro; V. Ramamurthy
- Website: https://www.bgsu.edu/sivagroup/

Jayaraman Sivaguru (Siva) is the Distinguished University Professor at Bowling Green State University. He also holds the Antonia and Marshall Wilson Professorship at the Department of Chemistry, Center for Photochemical Sciences,Bowling Green State University, Bowling Green, Ohio. He is a recipient of 2008 National Science Foundation CAREER Award, 2010 Grammaticakis-Neumann Prize from the Swiss Chemical Society, 2011 young-investigator award from the Inter-American Photochemical Society (I-APS), and 2012-young investigator award from Sigma Xi. His honors also include Excellence in Research award, 2011 Excellence in Teaching award, and the 2012 Peltier Award for Innovation in Teaching. Prof. Sivaguru has received numerous international recognitions including the 2021 Honda-Fujishima Award from the Japanese Photochemical Society, 2025 Probost Lectureship, Chemical Research Society of India Medal in 2027. He was also named a Fulbright Scholar in 2025. He is an editor for the Journal of Photochemistry and Photobiology A: Chemistry and from 2020 serves as the co-Editor-in-Chief of Journal of Photochemistry and Photobiology published by Elsevier. He is an international board member of the International Union of Pure and Applied Chemistry (IUPAC) photochemistry symposium.

Prof. Jayaraman Sivaguru is known for developing an array of new photoreactions - Aza Paternò-Büchi reaction, photo-ene reaction and transposed Paternò-Büchi reaction. He was one of the first researchers to utilize restricted bond rotations in the excited state to control asymmetric photoreactions - conceptually known as Atropselective phototoreactions. His research group showed that atropisomeric thioureas can be utilized as organophotocatalysts for enantioselective photochemical reactions and developed a mechanistic model for the observed chiral induction. His group also developed Supramolecular Photocatalysis based on Cucurbitruil nano-containers. His research work led the use of light to degrade polymers from bio-resources and recover the degraded products to resynthesize the polymer making a sustainable and recyclable polymer.
