= Frank Scheffold =

German physicist (born 1969)

Frank Scheffold (Pfullendorf, Germany, 28 May 1969) is the head of the Soft Matter and Photonics Group in the physics department at the University of Fribourg, Switzerland.

He studied at the University of Konstanz in Germany, as well as the Weizmann Institute of Science (Israel, with Prof. J. Klein). He obtained his doctorate summa cum laude at the University of Konstanz, for research carried out with Prof. G. Maret at the Institute Charles Sadron (Strasbourg, France) and Konstanz. His research in the Soft Matter and Photonics Group focuses on the optics of complex systems, dynamic light scattering and diffuse light propagation, the dynamics, aggregation and phase behaviour of colloidal systems and the production and characterization of soft materials. He is author and co-author of almost 100 articles. He is currently a member of the Swiss National Research Council and the Steering Committee for "Polymers and Colloids" at the Swiss Chemical Society.

As of 2022, his i10-index is 96, according to Google Scholar; his most cited papers are:

- García-Etxarri, A.; Gómez-Medina, R.; Froufe-Pérez, L. S.; López, C.; Chantada, L.; Scheffold, F.; Aizpurua, J.; Nieto-Vesperinas, M.; Sáenz, J. J. (28 February 2011). "Strong magnetic response of submicron Silicon particles in the infrared". Optics Express. 19 (6): 4815–4826. arXiv:1005.5446. Bibcode:2011OExpr..19.4815G. doi:10.1364/oe.19.004815. ISSN 1094-4087. PMID 21445117. S2CID 5266917.
- Scheffold, Frank; Lenke, Ralf; Tweer, Ralf; Maret, Georg (1999). "Localization or classical diffusion of light?". Nature. 398 (6724): 206–207. Bibcode:1999Natur.398..206S. doi:10.1038/18347. S2CID 4347650.
- Scheffold, Frank; Maret, Georg (1998). "Universal Conductance Fluctuations of Light". Phys. Rev. Lett. 81 (26): 5800–5803. Bibcode:1998PhRvL..81.5800S. doi:10.1103/PhysRevLett.81.5800.
