= Journal of Biomolecular NMR =

- Discipline: Nuclear magnetic resonance spectroscopy
- Language: English
- Edited by: Gerhard Wagner

Publication details
- History: 1991-present
- Publisher: Springer Science+Business Media
- Frequency: Monthly
- Impact factor: 2.835 (2020)

Standard abbreviations
- ISO 4: J. Biomol. NMR

Indexing
- ISSN: 0925-2738 (print); 1573-5001 (web)

Links
- Journal homepage

The Journal of Biomolecular NMR publishes research on technical developments and innovative applications of nuclear magnetic resonance spectroscopy for the study of structure and dynamic properties of biopolymers in solution, liquid crystals, solids and mixed environments. Some of the main topics include experimental and computational approaches for the determination of three-dimensional structures of proteins and nucleic acids, advancements in the automated analysis of NMR spectra, and new methods to probe and interpret molecular motions.

The journal was founded in 1991 by Kurt Wüthrich, who later received a Nobel prize in Chemistry in 2002 for his seminal contributions to the field of NMR. Now, the current editor-in-chief is Gerhard Wagner (Harvard Medical School).

According to the Journal Citation Reports, the journal has a 2020 impact factor of 2.835.

== Associate Editors ==
Accompanying Gerhard Wagner (editor-in-chief), the Associate Editors of the Journal of Biomolecular NMR are:

- Ad Bax (NIH, USA)
- Martin Billeter (Göteborg University, Sweden)
- Lewis E. Kay (University of Toronto, Canada)
- Rob Kaptein (Utrecht University, The Netherlands)
- Gottfried Otting (Australian National University, Australia)
- Arthur G. Palmer (Columbia University, USA)
- Tatyana Polenova (University of Delaware, USA), and
- Bernd Reif (TU Munich, Germany)

== Most cited articles ==
According to the Web of Science, as of August 2018, there are seven Journal of Biomolecular NMR articles with over 1,500 citations:

1. Delaglio, F.; Grzesiek, S.; Vuister, G.W.; Zhu, G.; Pfeifer, J.; Bax, A. (1995). "NMRPipe: A multidimensional spectral processing system based on UNIX pipes". Journal of Biomolecular NMR. 6 (3): 277–293. doi:10.1007/BF00197809. hdl:2381/24001. PMID 8520220. – cited 9,252 times.
2. Laskowski, R.A.; Rullmann, J.C.; MacArthur, M.W.; Kaptein, R.; Thornton, J.M. (1996). "AQUA and PROCHECK-NMR: Programs for checking the quality of protein structures solved by NMR". Journal of Biomolecular NMR. 8 (4): 477–486. doi:10.1007/BF00228148. PMID 9008363. – cited 3,527 times.
3. Piotto, M.; Saudek, V.; Sklenář, V. (1992). "Gradient-tailored excitation for single-quantum NMR spectroscopy of aqueous solutions". Journal of Biomolecular NMR. 2 (6): 661–665. doi:10.1007/BF02192855. PMID 1490109. – cited 3,199 times.
4. Cornilescu, G.; Delaglio, F.; Bax, A. (1999). "Protein backbone angle restraints from searching a database for chemical shift and sequence homology". Journal of Biomolecular NMR. 13 (3): 289–302. doi:10.1023/A:1008392405740. PMID 10212987. – cited 2,540 times.
5. Johnson, B.A.; Blevins, R.A. (1994). "NMR View: A computer program for the visualization and analysis of NMR data". Journal of Biomolecular NMR. 4 (5): 603–614. doi:10.1007/BF00404272. PMID 22911360. – cited 2,288 times.
6. Wishart, D.S.; Bigam, C.G.; Yao, J.; Abildgaard, F; Dyson, J.; Oldfield, E.; Markley, J.L.; Sykes, B.D. (1995). "1H, 13C and 15N chemical shift referencing in biomolecular NMR". Journal of Biomolecular NMR. 6 (2): 135–140. doi:10.1007/BF00211777. PMID 8589602. – cited 1,781 times.
7. Wishart, D.S.; Sykes, B.D. (1994). "The 13C Chemical-Shift Index: A simple method for the identification of protein secondary structure using 13C chemical-shift data". Journal of Biomolecular NMR. 4 (2): 171–180. doi:10.1007/BF00175245. PMID 8019132. – cited 1,723 times.
