= R. Bruce King =

R. Bruce King is emeritus professor at the University of Georgia. He has contributed to many areas of organometallic chemistry, including synthesis, spectroscopy, and theory. He is the author and editor of several monographs and book series.

Structure of Fe_{2}(SCH_{3})_{2}(CO)_{6}, isomers of which King separated and characterized.

== Training and research interests ==
He received his Ph.D. in 1961 under the direction of F. Gordon A. Stone at Harvard for research on organocobalt and organoiron compounds. He subsequently conducted studies on synthetic organometallic chemistry at DuPont and then at the Mellon Institute. His endeavors led to the first examples of diazonium complexes. His contributions also include organophosphorus ligands.

== Recognition ==
Among his accolades, King was recognized by the American Chemical Society Awards in Pure Chemistry (1971) and in Inorganic Chemistry (1991).
