= Wiebke Drenckhan =

German physicist

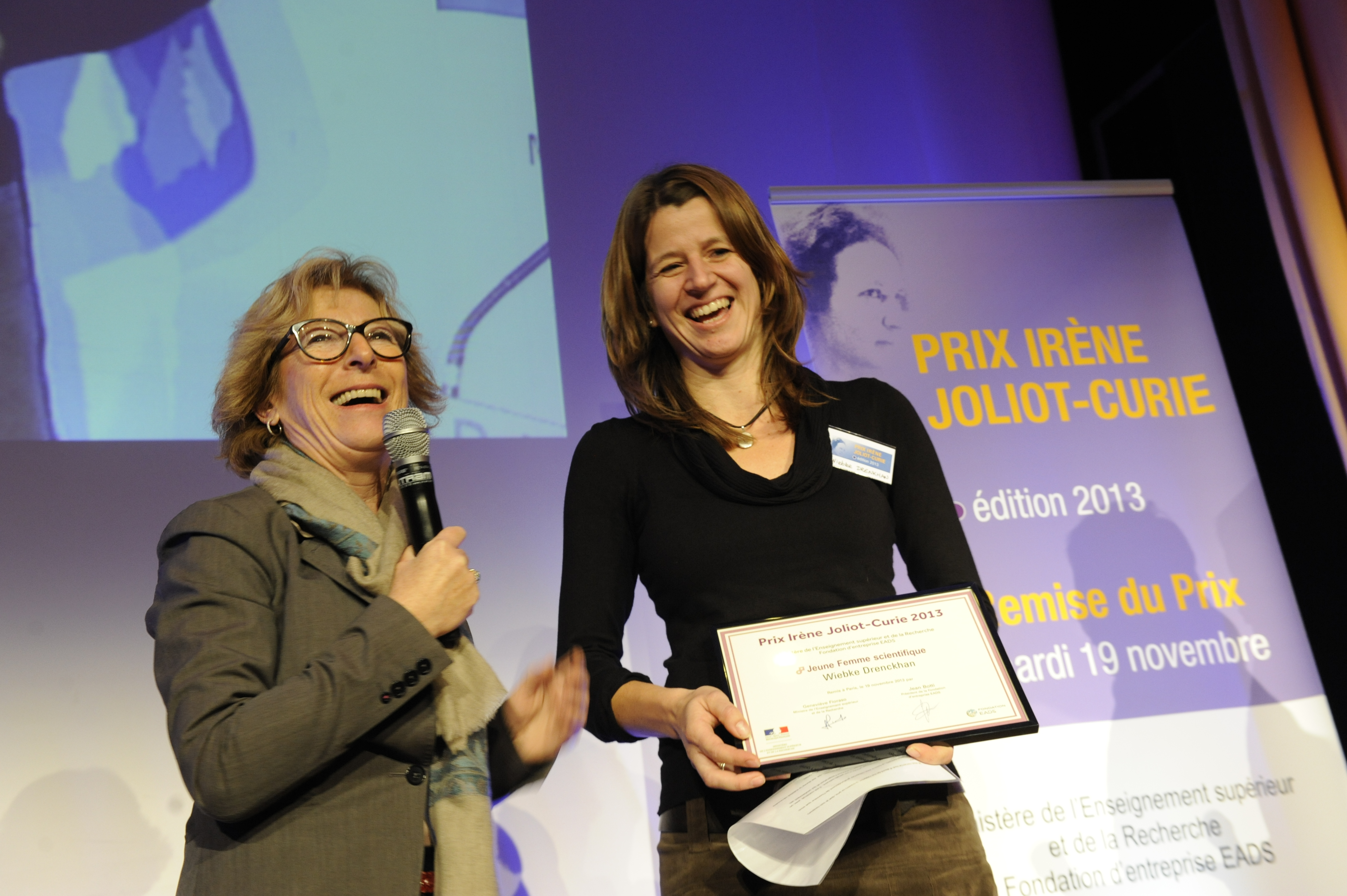
- Wiebke Drenckhan (left) receiving the 2013 Irène Joliot-Curie Prize from Geneviève Fioraso, Minister for Higher Education and Research of France
- Born: April 6, 1977; Bad Belzig
- Education: Trinity College Dublin
- Scientific career
- Fields: Physics
- Institutions: CNRS; Institut Charles Sadron; Paris Diderot University; Laboratoire de Physique des Solides
- Thesis: Stability and motion of foams and films in confined geometries (2004)
- Doctoral advisor: Denis Weaire

Wiebke Drenckhan, born 6 April 1977 in Bad Belzig, is a German physicist. She is a CNRS research director at the Institut Charles Sadron, where she investigates the physics and physical chemistry of liquid and solid foams and emulsions. She also works as illustrator for scientific journals and popular science books and she collaborates regularly with artists and designers.

== Biography ==
After studying physics and mathematics in Germany (University of Rostock, Humboldt University Berlin) and New Zealand (University of Canterbury) she joins Trinity College Dublin for her PhD thesis under the supervision of Denis Weaire. In the following, she receives an EMBARK Fellowship from the Irish Research Council, before being invited on a 1-year research stay by the city of Paris to work at the University Paris-Diderot. In 2007, she is hired by the CNRS and joins Dominique Langevin’s research group at the Laboratoire de Physique des Solides at Paris-Sud University. In 2014 she obtains her Habilitation à Diriger les Recherches on the topic “A science of transition – from liquid to solid foams”. In 2016, she moves her research activities to the Institut Charles Sadron at the University of Strasbourg.

== Research ==
Wiebke Drenckhan works on the physics and physical chemistry of liquid and solid foams and emulsions. Linking fundamental and applied research, she combines experiments and computer simulations to advance our understanding of the generation, stability and structure of liquid foams and emulsions. She uses this understanding to propose new approaches for the generation of solid polymer foams with controlled structural properties in a “liquid templating” approach, with the goal to understand and control their structure-property relations. Of particular interest to her work is the development of interfacial mechanisms to modify in a controlled manner how bubbles and drops interact in foams and emulsions in order to create self-assembled polymeric metamaterials.

== Awards ==
- 2012 ERC Starting Grant
- 2013 Irène Joliot-Curie Prize for “Young French Female Scientist of the Year”
- 2013 Henkel Laundry & Home Care Research Award
- 2015 CNRS Bronze Medal
- 2019 ERC Consolidator grant

== Outreach ==
Wiebke Drenckhan is actively involved in different scientific outreach activities. She collaborates regularly with artists and designers. She also works as cartoonist and illustrator for scientific journals and popular science books. She provided for many years physics cartoons for the German Physik Journal and illustrated the “Physics in Daily life” Column by Jo Hermans in Europhysics News.
