= ACS Award in Pure Chemistry =

Award of the American Chemical Society

The American Chemical Society Award in Pure Chemistry is awarded annually by the American Chemical Society (ACS) "to recognize and encourage fundamental research in pure chemistry carried out in North America by young men and women." "Young" means born within 35 years of the awarding of the Award, which takes place at the Spring meeting of the ACS. To be eligible, a nominee "must have accomplished research of unusual merit for an individual on the threshold of her or his career. Special consideration is given to independence of thought and originality in the research...." The award was first awarded in 1931, with Linus Pauling the inaugural recipient. It is sponsored by Alpha Chi Sigma fraternity and the Alpha Chi Sigma Educational Foundation.

== List of recipients ==
Source: American Chemical Society

- 2025 Timothy C. Berkelbach
- 2024 Jarad Mason
- 2023 Julia Kalow
- 2022 Gabriela Schlau-Cohen
- 2021 Rebekka Klausen
- 2020 Corinna S. Schindler
- 2019 Danna Freedman
- 2018 Mircea Dincă
- 2017 Neal K. Devaraj
- 2016 Jonathan S. Owen
- 2015 Adam E. Cohen
- 2014 Sara E. Skrabalak
- 2013 Theodor Agapie
- 2012 Oleg V. Ozerov
- 2011 Melanie Sanford
- 2010 Phil S. Baran
- 2009 Garnet K.-L. Chan
- 2008 Rustem F. Ismagilov
- 2007 Xiaowei Zhuang
- 2006 David R. Liu
- 2005 Peidong Yang
- 2004 Mei Hong
- 2003 Jillian M. Buriak
- 2002 Hongjie Dai
- 2001 Carolyn R. Bertozzi
- 2000 Chaitan Khosla
- 1999 Chad Mirkin
- 1998 Christopher C. Cummins
- 1997 Erick M. Carreira
- 1996 Ann E. McDermott
- 1995 M. Reza Ghadiri
- 1994 Gerard Parkin
- 1993 Jeremy M. Berg
- 1992 Charles M. Lieber
- 1991 Nathan S. Lewis
- 1990 Peter G. Schultz
- 1989 Stuart L. Schreiber
- 1988 Jacqueline K. Barton
- 1987 George McLendon
- 1986 Peter Wolynes
- 1985 Ben S. Freiser
- 1984 Eric Oldfield
- 1983 Michael J. Berry
- 1982 Stephen Leone
- 1981 Mark S. Wrighton
- 1980 John E. Bercaw
- 1979 Henry F. Schaefer, III
- 1978 Jesse L. Beauchamp
- 1977 Barry M. Trost
- 1976 Karl F. Freed
- 1975 George M. Whitesides
- 1974 Nicholas Turro
- 1973 John I. Brauman
- 1972 Roy G. Gordon
- 1971 R. Bruce King
- 1970 Harry B. Gray
- 1969 Roald Hoffmann
- 1968 Orville L. Chapman
- 1967 John D. Baldeschwieler
- 1966 Ronald Breslow
- 1965 Dudley R. Herschbach
- 1964 Marshall Fixman
- 1963 Stuart A. Rice
- 1962 Harden M. McConnell
- 1961 Eugene E. van Tamelen
- 1960 Elias J. Corey
- 1959 Ernest M. Grunwald
- 1958 Carl Djerassi
- 1957 Gilbert J. Stork
- 1956 Paul M. Doty
- 1955 Paul Delahay
- 1954 John D. Roberts
- 1953 William von E. Doering
- 1952 Harrison S. Brown
- 1951 John C. Sheehan
- 1950 Verner Schomaker
- 1949 Richard T. Arnold
- 1948 Saul Winstein
- 1947 Glenn T. Seaborg
- 1946 Charles C. Price, III
- 1945 Frederick T. Wall
- 1944 Arthur C. Cope
- 1943 Kenneth S. Pitzer
- 1942 John Lawrence Oncley
- 1941 Karl August Folkers
- 1940 Lawrence O. Brockway
- 1938 Paul Doughty Bartlett
- 1937 E. Bright Wilson, Jr.
- 1936 John Gamble Kirkwood
- 1935 Raymond M. Fuoss
- 1934 C. Frederick Koelsch
- 1933 Frank H. Spedding
- 1932 Oscar K. Rice
- 1931 Linus Pauling

== See also ==
- List of chemistry awards
