= Tatyana Polenova =

- Born: 1970 (age 55–56)
- Education: Moscow State University, Columbia University
- Scientific career
- Fields: Solid-state NMR, protein assemblies, HIV capsids
- Workplaces: Columbia University, Hunter College, University of Delaware
- Doctoral advisor: Ann McDermott

Tatyana Polenova is a professor in chemistry and biochemistry at the University of Delaware. She is the editor-in-chief of the Journal of Magnetic Resonance since 2021. Her research interest involves using solid-state nuclear magnetic resonance, combined with computational and other biophysical methods, to understand the structure, dynamics, and function of complex macromolecular assemblies, both biological and inorganic.

== Education and career ==
Polenova obtained her B.S. at the Lomonosov Moscow State University in 1992. She obtained her Ph.D. at Columbia University in 1997 and continued her postdoctoral research with Ann McDermott. She was appointed to assistant professor at Hunter College of the City University of New York in 1999, and moved to the University of Delaware in 2003, where she achieved full professor in 2011. She is the director of the NIH-COBRE "Molecular Design of Advanced Biomaterials" since 2014.

== Research ==
Polenova uses nuclear magnetic resonance spectroscopy (NMR), specifically solid-state NMR, to investigate the structure and dynamics of biopolymers and inorganic materials. Her research focuses on the protein-based capsid assemblies of HIV-1, the most common strain of the virus that causes HIV/AIDS. She has also investigated protein assemblies that are associated with microtubules, important in the cytoskeleton, where breakdown of these assemblies can lead to various diseases. To enable new insight on complex systems, she develops new solid-state NMR methods for fast magic angle spinning (40–110 kHz), 19F NMR, and signal enhancement using dynamic nuclear polarization.
