= Gerard Meijer =

Dutch chemical physicist (born 1962)

Gerardus Johannes Maria Meijer (born 1962 in Zeddam), more often Gerard J. M. Meijer is a Dutch physicist who has made significant contributions in the field of molecular physics, with a particular focus on laser-based spectroscopic detection techniques and cold molecules. His group invented the technique of Stark deceleration using the Stark effect for controlled generation of cold molecules.

== Education and career ==
Meijer was born in Zeddam and attended high school in Doetinchem. He studied physics at Radboud University in Nijmegen from 1980, receiving his diploma in 1985 and his Ph.D. in Physics from the same university in 1988 under the supervision of Antoni Dymanus and Peter Andresen. After completing his Ph.D., Meijer spent a year as a post-doc at the IBM Research Center in San Jose, California, where he worked in the group of Mattanjah de Vries on laser desorption mass spectrometry and optical spectroscopy, as well as fullerene. He then returned to Radboud University as a University Lecturer, where he continued his research on cavity ring-down spectroscopy and fullerene crystals.

In 1995, Meijer was appointed as a Full Professor in Experimental Physics at Radboud University, where he continued his research on laser-based spectroscopic techniques and cold molecules. He also became involved in molecular physics studies with IR-FEL (FELIX) radiation.

In 2000, Meijer was appointed as the Director of the FOM Institute for Plasma Physics "Rijnhuizen" in Nieuwegein, The Netherlands, where he continued his research on cold molecules and molecular physics studies with FELIX. In 2002, he was appointed as the Director of the Fritz Haber Institute of the Max Planck Society in Berlin, Germany, where he continued his research on gas-phase molecular physics, cold molecules, clusters, and biomolecules. In 2012, Meijer became an External Scientific Member of the Fritz Haber Institute and also took on the role of President of the Executive Board at Radboud University. Since 2017, he returned to the directorship of the Fritz Haber Institute.

== Honors and awards ==
Throughout his career, Meijer has received numerous awards and accolades for his contributions to the field of molecular physics, including the van't Hoff Prize from the German Bunsen Society in 2012 and the Bourke Award from the Royal Society of Chemistry in 2009. He has also was elected as a corresponding member of the Royal Netherlands Academy of Arts and Sciences in 2004 and member of the Academia Europaea in 2013.
