= Ernest Grunwald =

Ernest Grunwald (November 2, 1923 – March 28, 2002) was a German-born American physical organic chemist, a member of the National Academy of Sciences, the chair of the chemistry department at Brandeis University. He was also noted for his 1997 textbook Thermodynamics of Molecular Species. Awarded the ACS Award in Pure Chemistry in 1959.

== Career and life ==
Grunwald graduated from the University of California, Los Angeles in 1944 with a B.S. in chemistry and B.A. in physics in 1944. He received his doctorate in 1947. In 1965, he became the chairman of the chemistry department at Brandeis University. Grunwald retired in 1989.
