= Journal of Magnetic Resonance =

- Discipline: Chemistry
- Language: English
- Edited by: Tatyana Polenova

Publication details
- History: 1969–present
- Publisher: Elsevier
- Frequency: monthly
- Impact factor: 2.624 (2019)

Standard abbreviations
- ISO 4: J. Magn. Reson.

Indexing
- CODEN: JMARF3
- ISSN: 1090-7807
- LCCN: 97658016
- OCLC no.: 37013322

Links
- Journal homepage; Online access

The Journal of Magnetic Resonance (JMR) is a monthly peer-reviewed scientific journal that publishes original research in the field of magnetic resonance, including nuclear magnetic resonance, electron paramagnetic resonance, magnetic resonance imaging, magnetic resonance spectroscopy and nuclear quadrupole resonance. Since 2021, its editor-in-chief has been Tatyana Polenova of the University of Delaware. According to the Journal Citation Reports, it has an impact factor of 2.624 (as of 2019). Authors can pay a fee to have their articles published as open access.

== History ==
Since its establishment in 1969, the journal has been published under different names:

- Journal of Magnetic Resonance, (1969–1992) ISSN 0022-2364
- Journal of Magnetic Resonance, Series A, (1993–1996) ISSN 1064-1858
- Journal of Magnetic Resonance, Series B, (1993–1996) ISSN 1096-0872
- Journal of Magnetic Resonance, (1997–present) ISSN 1090-7807

The Journal of Magnetic Resonance is the official journal of the International Society of Magnetic Resonance (ISMAR), the umbrella professional society for scientists working in all areas of magnetic resonance:

1. NMR (nuclear magnetic resonance)
2. ESR/EPR (electron spin/paramagnetic resonance)
3. MRI (magnetic resonance imaging)
4. And related theoretical/methodological fields.

ISMAR was established in 1971. It organizes the biennial ISMAR conferences, which are among the most important international meetings in magnetic resonance science.

== Most cited articles ==
According to the Web of Science, as of November 2016, there are 24 articles published in the Journal of Magnetic Resonance that have been cited more than 1,000 times. The four articles that have been cited the most, with more than 2,500 citations, are:

1. Bax, A.; Davis, D.G. (1985). "MLEV-17-based two-dimensional homonuclear magnetization transfer spectroscopy". Journal of Magnetic Resonance. 65 (2): 355–360. Bibcode:1985JMagR..65..355B. doi:10.1016/0022-2364(85)90018-6. – cited 4,318 times.
2. States, D.J.; Haberkorn, R.A.; Ruben, D.J. (1982). "A two-dimensional nuclear overhauser experiment with pure absorption phase in 4 quadrants". Journal of Magnetic Resonance. 48 (2): 186–202. Bibcode:1982JMagR..48..286S. doi:10.1016/0022-2364(82)90279-7. – cited 3,187 times.
3. Braunschweiler, L.; Ernst, R.R. (1983). "Coherence transfer by isotropic mixing: Application to proton correlation spectroscopy". Journal of Magnetic Resonance. 53 (3): 521–528. Bibcode:1983JMagR..53..521B. doi:10.1016/0022-2364(83)90226-3. – cited 2,980 times.
4. Basser, P.J.; Pierpaoli, C. (1996). "Microstructural and physiological features of tissues elucidated by quantitative-diffusion-tensor MRI". Journal of Magnetic Resonance, Series B. 111 (3): 209–219. Bibcode:1996JMRB..111..209B. doi:10.1006/jmrb.1996.0086. PMID 8661285. – cited 2,537 times.

== Abstracting and Indexing ==
The Journal of Magnetic Resonance is abstracted and indexed in:

- Chemical Abstracts
- Current Contents/Physics, Chemical & Earth Sciences
- Index to Scientific Reviews
- Science Abstracts
- Science Citation Index
- Scopus
