= Joan van der Waals =

Dutch physicist (1920–2022)

- Born: Joan Henri van der Waals; 2 May 1920; Amsterdam, North Holland, Netherlands
- Died: 21 June 2022 (aged 102)
- Education: University of Groningen
- Known for: Van der Waals–Platteeuw clathrate hydrate model
- Relatives: Johannes Diderik van der Waals (first cousin, thrice removed)
- Awards: Bourke Award (1962)
- Scientific career
- Fields: Molecular physics
- Workplaces: Leiden University
- Thesis: Thermodynamic properties of mixtures of alkanes differing in chain length (1950)

Joan Henri van der Waals (2 May 1920 – 21 June 2022) was a Dutch physicist. He was professor of experimental physics at Leiden University between 1967 and 1989. He specialized in molecular physics and clathrate hydrates. One of Van der Waals's most significant contributions to the study of hydrates was a series of papers between 1953 and 1958, which eventually culminated in the 1959 publication of his paper on the canonical partition function for clathrates, along with J. C. Platteeuw. To create this partition function, van der Waals made a number of simplifying assumptions, most prominently that neighboring guest gas molecules cannot interact and there is a maximum of one guest per cage.

== Early life ==
Van der Waals was born on 2 May 1920 in Amsterdam. A book on the Bohr model sparked his interest in physics. After finishing his high school in Amsterdam he moved to London to work as an intern-apprentice in a laboratory. When he returned to the Netherlands he started a combined study of physics, chemistry and maths at the University of Amsterdam. With the German invasion of the Netherlands in May 1940, Van der Waals was called for military service for the mounted artillery. He was made prisoner of war but was allowed to return to his studies in June 1940. In 1942, Van der Waals completed the long-distance tour-skating event, the Elfstedentocht. In 1943 he refused to sign the Loyaliteitsverklaring and went into hiding. He joined the underground courier service Rolls Royce. One of his activities was to make contact from The Hague with already liberated parts of the Netherlands to exchange communication. Van der Waals was caught by the authorities three times during the war-period, but managed to escape each time. Near the end of the war he went into hiding with family members living in the Veluwe region. When this area was liberated he was recruited as a translator for the Alsos Mission because he was able to speak German and English. In this capacity he was part of the liberation of Utrecht and saw the German technological facilities in Hook of Holland.

== Career ==
After the war ended, Van der Waals finished his studies at the University of Amsterdam in October 1945. He then started working for the Koninklijke Shell Laboratorium Amsterdam. He obtained his doctorate at the University of Groningen in 1950, with a thesis titled Thermodynamic Properties of Mixtures of Alkanes Differing in Chain Length. In the 1950s, Van der Waals developed insights in the description of clathrates and hydrates related to noble gas compound, resulting in the 1959 Van der Waals–Platteeuw clathrate hydrate theory. Van der Waals was appointed professor of experimental physics at Leiden University in 1967, and retired in 1989. He specialized in molecular physics.

In 1962, Van der Waals received the Bourke Award of the Royal Society of Chemistry. Van der Waals was elected a member of the Royal Netherlands Academy of Arts and Sciences (KNAW) in 1971. He served on the board of the KNAW between 1984 and 1987. He has been an honorary member of the Royal Netherlands Chemical Society since 1998. Van der Waals was appointed Knight in the Order of the Netherlands Lion.

Van der Waals has been involved in the conservation and restoration of the Trippenhuis, the seat of the KNAW, since the 1980s.

== Personal life ==
Van der Waals was married to Liesbeth van der Waals (1920–2014), with whom he had three children. In 1967 the pair separated. Van der Waals was the first cousin, twice removed, of Dutch Nobel Prize–winning physicist Johannes Diderik van der Waals. He was an avid sailor and has made trips to the polar circle and Argentina.

Van der Waals turned 100 on 2 May 2020, and died on 21 June 2022, at the age of 102.
