= Roy G. Gordon =

American chemist (born 1940)

- Born: 1940 (age 85–86); Akron, Ohio, U.S.
- Education: Harvard University (AB, AM, PhD)
- Known for: Intermolecular forces theory Atomic layer deposition Thin-film deposition processes
- Awards: ACS Award in Pure Chemistry (1972); Bourke Award; Eni Award (2019)
- Scientific career
- Fields: Chemical physics Materials chemistry Thin-film deposition
- Workplaces: Harvard University
- Doctoral advisor: John Hasbrouck Van Vleck

Roy Gerald Gordon (born 1940) is an American chemist and professor of chemistry at Harvard University. His research has included theoretical chemical physics, materials chemistry, and energy-related technologies, including chemical vapor deposition and energy storage systems.

== Early life and education ==
Gordon was born in Akron, Ohio, in 1940. He received a bachelor's degree in chemistry and physics from Harvard College in 1961, followed by a master's degree in 1962 and a PhD in chemical physics in 1964 under John Hasbrouck Van Vleck.

== Career and research ==
Gordon joined the faculty of Harvard University in 1966 and is Thomas D. Cabot Professor of Chemistry. His early work focused on theoretical descriptions of intermolecular forces, molecular collisions, and spectroscopic phenomena, using methods from quantum mechanics and statistical mechanics. These studies contributed to understanding molecular motion in gases, liquids, and solids, and to the interpretation of spectroscopic line shapes.

His later research expanded into materials chemistry and applied processes, including chemical vapor deposition and atomic layer deposition (ALD). His group demonstrated methods for rapid deposition of conformal thin films, including silica nanolaminates, and developed atomic layer deposition processes for transition metals and metal oxides. These methods enabled conformal coatings for applications in microelectronics and optical materials.

His applied work includes the development of thin-film coatings for energy-efficient windows, materials for solar cells, diffusion barriers in microelectronics, and thin-film optical structures.

Gordon has also contributed to energy technologies, including the development of aqueous organic flow batteries for large-scale energy storage.

== Honors and awards ==
He was elected to the National Academy of Sciences in 1975 and to the American Academy of Arts and Sciences in 1976. Gordon received the ACS Award in Pure Chemistry in 1972 for his theoretical work on intermolecular forces. He also received the Bourke Award of the Royal Society of Chemistry in 1977.
