= George Büchi =

Swiss organic chemist (1921–1998)

- Born: August 1, 1921; Baden, Switzerland
- Died: August 28, 1998 (aged 77); Switzerland
- Education: ETH Zürich
- Awards: Ernest Guenther Award (1958)
- Scientific career
- Fields: Organic chemistry
- Workplaces: Massachusetts Institute of Technology
- Thesis: Beitrag zur Konstitutionsaufklärung des Breins (1949)
- Doctoral advisor: Leopold Ružička
- Doctoral students: Edward M. Burgess

George Hermann Büchi (August 1, 1921 – August 28, 1998) was a Swiss organic chemist and professor at the Massachusetts Institute of Technology. "Paternò's reaction", known since the early twentieth century, was renamed to the "Paternò–Büchi reaction" based on enhancements made to it by Büchi's research group.

Büchi died at the age of 77 of heart failure while hiking with his wife in Switzerland.
