= Ann McDermott =

American chemist

Ann E. McDermott
- Education: Harvey Mudd College, University of California, Berkeley
- Known for: Nuclear Magnetic Resonance (NMR); Protein structure and dynamics
- Awards: ACS Award in Pure Chemistry (1996); Bourke Award (2014)
- Scientific career
- Fields: Biophysics, Biological chemistry
- Workplaces: Columbia University
- Academic advisors: Kenneth Sauer; Melvin Klein; Robert Griffin
- Website: mcdermott.chem.columbia.edu

Ann E. McDermott is an American biophysicist who uses nuclear magnetic resonance to study the structure, function, and dynamics of proteins in native-like environments. She is currently the Esther Breslow Professor of Biological Chemistry and Chair of the Educational Policy and Planning Committee of the Arts and Sciences at Columbia University. She has also previously served as Columbia's Associate Vice President for Academic Advising and Science Initiatives in the Arts and Sciences. She is an elected member of both the American Academy of Arts and Sciences and the National Academy of Sciences.

== Education ==
McDermott obtained her Bachelor of Science in Chemistry from Harvey Mudd College in Claremont, CA in 1981. In 1988, she obtained her doctoral degree at U.C. Berkeley in the Department of Chemistry with Kenneth Sauer and Melvin Klein.

== Career ==
As a post-doctoral researcher she worked with Robert G Griffin at The Massachusetts Institute of Technology. She joined Columbia University in 1991.

McDermott is a member of the board of trustees for Harvey Mudd College. She is also a member of the Board of the New York Structural Biology Center.

=== Research interests ===
McDermott's research exploits Nuclear Magnetic Resonance to study the functions, structures, and dynamics of proteins including enzymes, viral proteins, membrane proteins and amyloid proteins. In particular, her group uses and develops solid state methodology including high-resolution magic angle spinning.

=== Awards and honors ===
McDermott has won several awards and fellowships throughout her career including the DuPont Young Investigator Award (1992), the Cottrell Scholars Award (1994), the Alfred P. Sloan Research Fellowship (1995), the American Chemical Society's Award in Pure Chemistry (1996), the Eastern Analytic Symposium Award for Achievement in Magnetic Resonance (2005), and the Royal Society of Chemistry's Bourke Award (2014). In 2000, she was inducted into the American Academy of Arts and Sciences. In 2006, she was elected as a member of the National Academy of Sciences.
