= Strasbourg Institute of Material Physics and Chemistry =

Joint research unit in France

- Institut de Physique et Chimie des Matériaux de Strasbourg
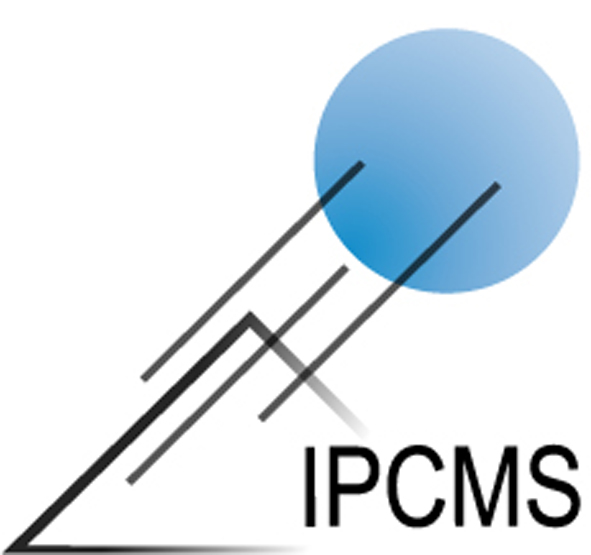

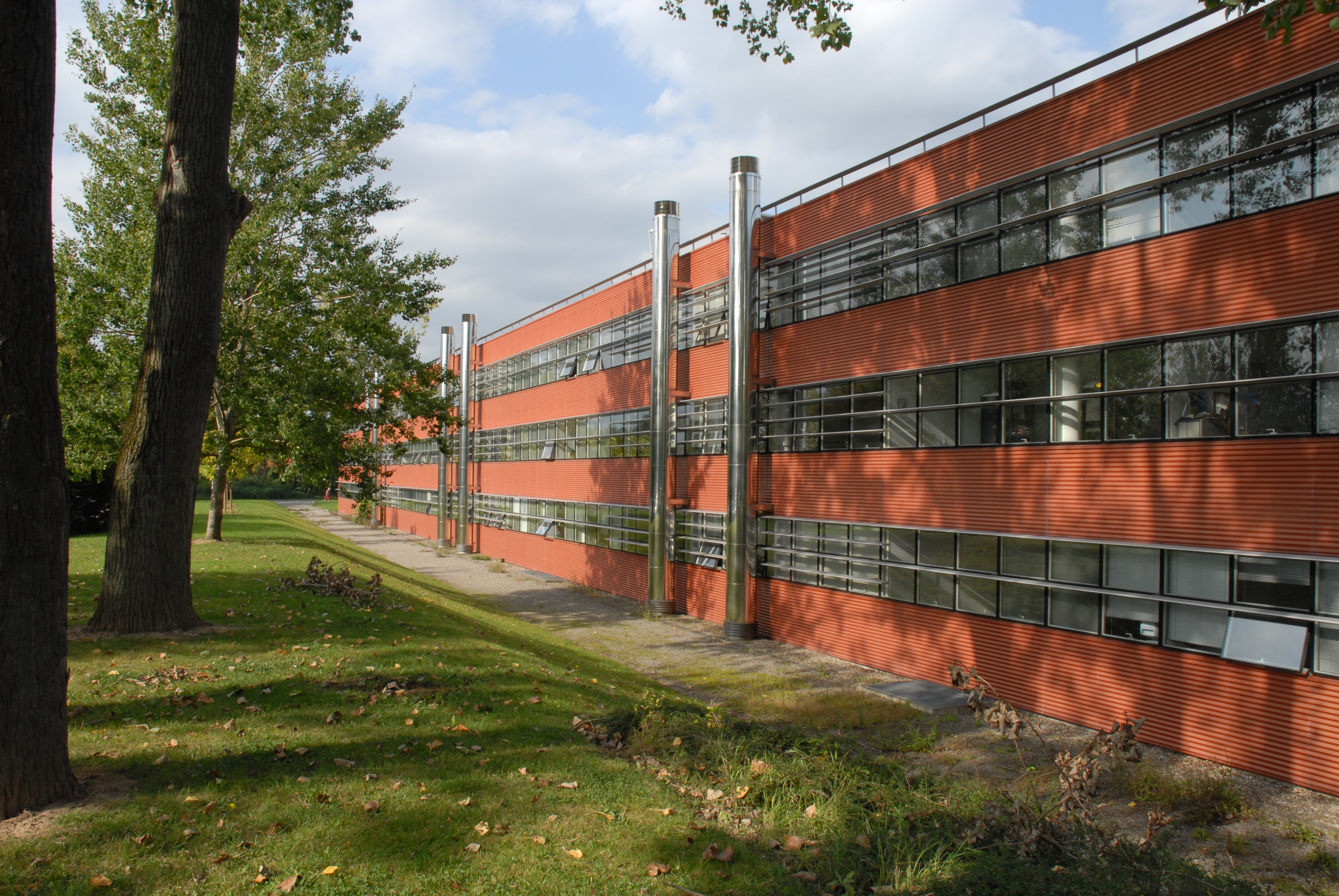
- Façade of the IPCMS
- Established: 1987
- Research type: Basic
- Field of research: Condensed matter Physical chemistry Material science
- Director: Pierre Rabu
- Deputy director: Rodolfo Jalabert
- Location: Bâtiment 69, 23 Rue du Loess, Strasbourg, Alsace, 67200, France; 48.606298°N 7.714680°E
- Campus: Campus of Cronenbourg
- Unit: UMR 7504
- Affiliations: University of Strasbourg; CNRS
- Website: www.ipcms.unistra.fr

The Strasbourg Institute of Material Physics and Chemistry (IPCMS—French: Institut de Physique et Chimie des Matériaux de Strasbourg) is a joint research unit (UMR 7504) between the French National Center for Scientific Research (CNRS) and the University of Strasbourg. It was founded in 1987 and is located in the district of Cronenbourg in Strasbourg, France.

== History ==
The IPCMS was born from a reflection initiated in the early eighties on the need to refocus and coordinate research in the physics and chemistry of condensed matter and materials. In the context of the then emerging Materials Center in Strasbourg, a first reorganization project for condensed matter physics was formalized in 1983. Then, in the same years, the strategic importance of materials for innovation is recognized, justifying the extension of the initial project to chemists, to constitute the backbone of the future institute by bringing together physicists and chemists on the objective of designing and studying new materials (metals, ceramics, ...) for their electronic properties (magnetic, optical, dielectric, etc.). CNRS-ULP (Note: Université Louis Pasteur, nowadays University of Strasbourg)-EHICS (Note: École des hautes études des industries chimiques de Strasbourg, nowadays ECPM) joint unit, the IPCMS is officially created in 1987 with François Gautier as Director and Jean-Claude Bernier as deputy director. Originally located on five different sites of the University of Strasbourg, it was in 1994 that members of the IPCMS were grouped together in the current building on the Campus of Cronenbourg. The IPCMS is then organized into five research groups around three types of materials - polymers and organic materials, metallic materials, ceramics and inorganic materials - and two topics of study: nonlinear optics and optoelectronics on one hand, surfaces and interfaces on the other hand.

== Research ==
The multi-disciplinary nature of the IPCMS is expressed by leading activities in spin electronics, magnetism, ultra-fast optics, electron microscopy and local probes, biomaterials as well as in the synthesis and characterization of functional organic, inorganic or hybrid materials. All scales are considered from the isolated molecule to organized nanostructures on surfaces and single or two-dimensional objects, up to nano-devices. To carry out these studies, the institute has an important instrumental park for the fabrication and characterization of materials at all scales. The developments are also based on recognized theoretical skills. The projects LabEX NIE and EquipEX UNION and UTEM that the IPCMS directs reflect the recognized position of the laboratory. Located on the Campus of Cronenbourg, IPCMS is affiliated with the institutes of physics and chemistry of the CNRS as well as the Faculty of Physics and Engineering, it is also affiliated with the European School of Chemistry, Polymers and Materials (ECPM), Télécom Physique Strasbourg, and the Faculty of Chemistry of the University of Strasbourg. The IPCMS is very attached to maintain strong links with the industrial laboratories carrying out research in its fields of competence.

=== Departments ===
The IPCMS now employs a staff of 240 including about 80 researchers and teacher-researchers and 60 technical and administrative engineers, whose activities are divided into five departments:

- Department of Inorganic Materials Chemistry (DCMI)
- Department of Organic Materials (DMO)
- Department of Magnetism of NanoStructured Objects (DMONS)
- Department of Ultrafast Optics and Nanophotonics (DON)
- Department Surfaces and Interfaces (DSI)

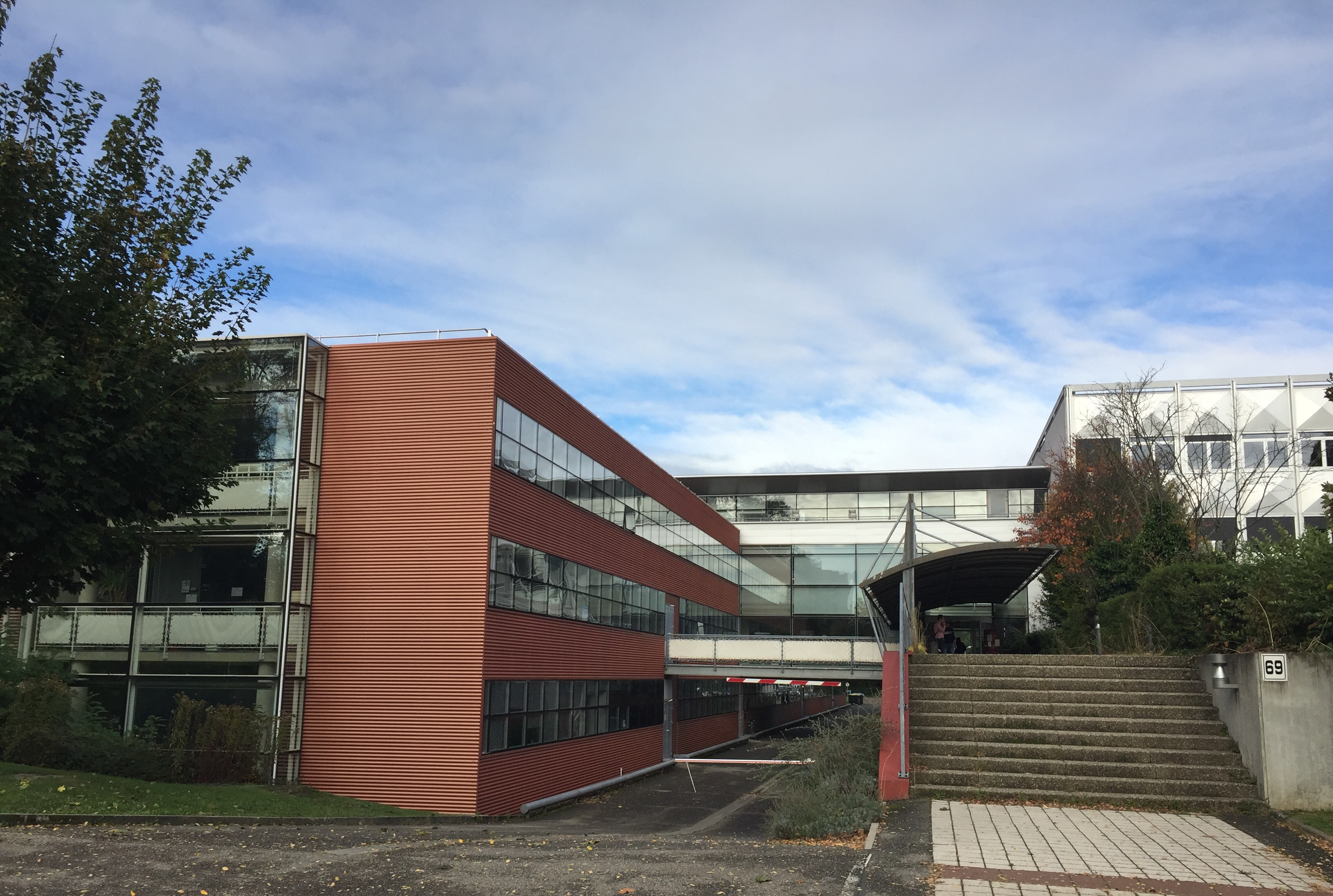
IPCMS main entrance

== Awards ==
- In 2008 Jean-Yves Bigot receives the CNRS silver medal, in 2009 he is also the recipient of an Advanced Grant ATOMAG from the European Research Council (ERC), and in February 2016 he received the Jean Ricard Award from the Société Française de Physique (SFP).
- In 2013 Guillaume Schull is a laureate of the ERC Consolidated APOGEE.
- July 2019, Ovidiu Ersen is the winner of the Grand Prize Raimond Castaing of the Société Francaise des Microscopies.

== See also ==
- Institut Charles Sadron
- Hubert Curien Multi-disciplinary Institute
