= Institut Charles Sadron =

French research institute

Coordinates: 48.6058°N 7.7120°E

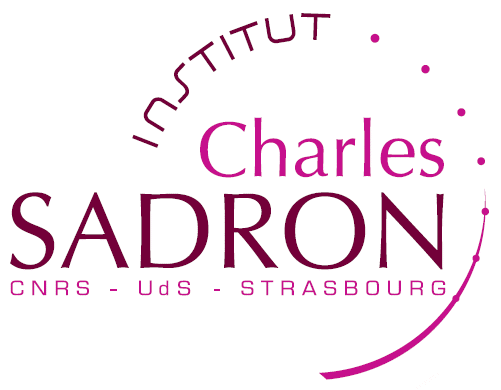
- Type: Public
- Established: 1954
- Founder: Charles Sadron
- Affiliations: CNRS - University of Strasbourg (UPR22)
- Director: Christian Gauthier
- Location: Strasbourg, France
- Website: www.ics-cnrs.unistra.fr

Institut Charles Sadron is a research center of the Centre national de la recherche scientifique (National Centre of Scientific Research), associated with the University of Strasbourg, which was created in 1954 to answer the demand for fundamental research in the emerging field of polymer science.

== History ==
In 1947, through the efforts of Charles Sadron (1902–1993), the Centre national de la recherche scientifique founded the Centre d'Etude de Physique Macromoléculaire (Centre for Study of Macromolecular Physics). This multidisciplinary centre including physicists, chemists and biologists, was dedicated to research in the field of macromolecular science.

In 1954, the Centre de Recherche sur les Macromolécules (Centre for Macromolecular research) became the first Centre National de la Recherche Scientifique-owned research unit to be installed in a provincial city. Charles Sadron was appointed director until he left for Orléans in 1967 to create a new laboratory, the Centre de Biophysique Moléculaire. His successor, Professor Henri Benoît took the leadership of the Centre de Recherche sur les Macromolécules until 1978.

During the 1970s, after the departure of the biologists, the Centre de Recherche sur les Macromolécules developed two major topics of research: the study of the solid state of macromolecules and the study of their structure and behavior in solution. The latter grew quite rapidly thanks to both the development of light and neutron scattering and the strong collaboration established with Pierre-Gilles de Gennes (collège de France), Paris) and the Léon Brillouin Laboratory at CEN-Saclay.

In 1985, through the integration of the research laboratories of Ecole d'Application des Hauts Polymères (School for Application of High Polymers), the Centre de Recherche sur les Macromolécules was renamed Institut Charles Sadron. The objective was to bring fundamental and applied research closer.

In 2008, the institute moved to a new building located at the Cronenbourg Centre National de la Recherche Scientifique campus with the aim to promote enhanced collaborations with the Pôle Matériaux Alsace (Materials Science Centre).

The directors have been C. Sadron, H. Benoit, C. Wippler, G. Weill, G. Maret, J.C Wittmann, J.-F. Legrand, J.-M. Guenet, with C. Gauthier being the current director.

== Research topics ==
The Institut Charles Sadron is a multidisciplinary laboratory performing research at the interface of chemistry, physics and material sciences. In 2011, it was composed of about:

- 54 researchers, lecturers and professors
- 44 engineers, technicians, and administrative staff
- 70 PhD students, postdoctoral researchers, research associates and students

The research activity covers the fields of polymer chemistry, supramolecular engineering, physico-chemistry of materials and soft matter physics. The three main research axes concern: polyelectrolytes, polymers at the interfaces and self-assembly systems.

=== Polyelectrolytes ===
Polyelectrolytes are water-soluble natural or synthetic ionic polymers used in pharmacology, biology, cosmetics etc. In many of the applications, polyelectrolytes are in contact with compounds possessing opposite charges and the complexity introduced in this mixture requires theoretical and experimental studies on model-compounds whatever the system used: polyelectrolyte complexes in solution or alternated multilayer of polyanions and polycations layer by layer).

- Research teams: Macromolecular Engineering at Interfaces, Polyelectrolyte Multilayers and Nano-Organized Multimaterials, Mixed systems based on polymers.

=== Polymer at interfaces ===
In many situations of surface chemistry or physics, grafted polymer chains are adsorbed or confined in thin films. Conformations and dynamics of macromolecules on surfaces are different from those observed in solution. This results in differences in physico-chemical and mechanical or structuration properties, which are still not perfectly understood and necessitate theoretical investigations and the use of simulation programs to complete the experimental observations.

- Research teams: Mechanics and physics of solid polymers, physics and biophysics of macromolecules at interfaces, precision macromolecular chemistry.

=== Self-assembly systems ===
They are due to molecular organization phenomena which result from the association and the reversible and spontaneous structuration of molecular or macromolecular species into entities with higher complexity. Nature is full of examples of complex systems governed by supramolecular chemistry principles. Despite their complexity, biological systems are an important source of inspiration for the development of new self-assembly systems. This approach needs converging efforts in organic synthesis and physico-chemistry in order to understand the thermodynamic and kinetic phenomena which allow self-assembly and self-organization of functional systems.

- Research teams: Supramolecular chemistry and self-assemblies, membranes and microforces, fluorinated self-assemblies for biomedical applications, organized molecular and macromolecular complex systems.

=== Theory and simulation ===
A fourth transverse axe is dedicated to theoretical studies and simulation of polymers.

- Research team: Theory and simulation

== Awards ==
Some members of the Institut Charles Sadron have been awarded several national or international prizes for their research.

Dr. Bernard Lotz received the 1973 prize of the French polymer group for his pioneering work on the structure of silk (shared with Dr. A. Brack from Centre de Biophysique Moléculaire Orléans).

Professor Henri Benoît and doctor André Kovacs were awarded the Physics Polymer Prize from the American Physical Society in 1978 and 1986, respectively.

In 1990, doctor Jean-Michel Guenet was awarded the Dillon medal also from the American Physical Society for his research on polymer chains conformation in semi-crystalline polymers and his contribution to the understanding of the nature of gel state.

Professor Gero Decher was awarded the Emilia Valori Prize 2009 attributed by the French Sciences Academie (Académie des sciences) and the prize Rhodia 2010, for his research on the layer by layer technique. He also received the 1999 prize of the French polymer group for his work on the layer-by-layer deposition technique.

Doctor Martin Brinkmann was awarded the GFP/SFP 2010 prize by the French Polymer Society (in French) GFP (a joint award by the Groupe Français d'études et d'applications des Polymères and the French Physical Society ((in French) SFP, Société Française de Physique) for his work on conjugated polymers.

Professor Nicolas Giuseppone (2010), Doctor Jean-François Lutz (2010) and Doctor Wiebke Drenckhan (2012) were laureates of the European Research Council Starting Grant, attributed by the European Research Council.

== Conferences ==
Since 2012, the "Charles Sadron Institute Conference Series" were created at the initiative of Jean-Michel Guenet, director of the institute. The first conference supported by the European Research Council took place in November 2012 at the Council of Europe in Strasbourg. 26 invited lectures were presented by a chemistry Nobel Prize laureate (Prof. Jean-Marie Lehn) and European Research Council laureates (Starting and Advanced grants).

- November, 22-24, 2012, Council of Europe, Strasbourg: European Research Council Grantees Conference: Frontier Research in Chemistry.

== Most relevant publications ==
- J.-F. Lutz, M. Ouchi, D. R. Liu, M. Sawamoto, Science (2013), vol. 341, p. 1238149.
- N. Giuseppone, J.-F. Lutz, Nature (2011), vol.473, pp 40–41.
- L. Tauk, A. Schröder, G., N. Giuseppone, Nature Chemistry (2009), vol.1, pp 649–656.
- D. Mertz, C. Vogt, J. Hemmerle, J. Mutterer, V. Ball, J.-C. Voegel, P. Schaaf, P. Lavalle, Nature Materials (2009), vol. 8, pp 731–735.
- J.-M. Guenet, Polymer-solvent Molecular Compounds, Elsevier Ed. 2008.
- G. Decher, Science (1997), vol. 277, pp 1232–1237.
- J.-F. Joanny, Science (1997), vol. 275, pp 1751–1752.
- A. Thess, R. Lee, P. Nikolaev, H. Dai, P. Petit, J. Robert, C. Xu, Y. H. Lee, S. G. Kim, D. T. Colbert, G. Seuseria, D. Tomanek, J. E. Fisher, R. E Smalley, Science (1996), vol. 273, pp 483–487.
- D. Danino, Y. Talmon, H. Levy, G. Beinert, R. Zana, Science (1995), vol. 269, pp 1420–1421.
- G. Widawski, M. Rawiso, B. François, Nature (1994), vol. 369, pp 387–389.
- J.-S. Higgins, H. Benoît, Polymer and neutron Scatterings, Clarendon Press, Oxford, 1994.
- J.-M. Guenet, Thermoreversible Gelation of Polymers and Biopolymers, Academic Press, 1992.
- J.-C. Wittmann, P. Smith, Nature (1991), vol. 352, pp 414–417.

== See also ==
- Hubert Curien Multi-disciplinary Institute
- Institute for Physics and Chemistry of Materials in Strasbourg
