= Miguel García-Garibay =

Chemistry and biochemistry Professor

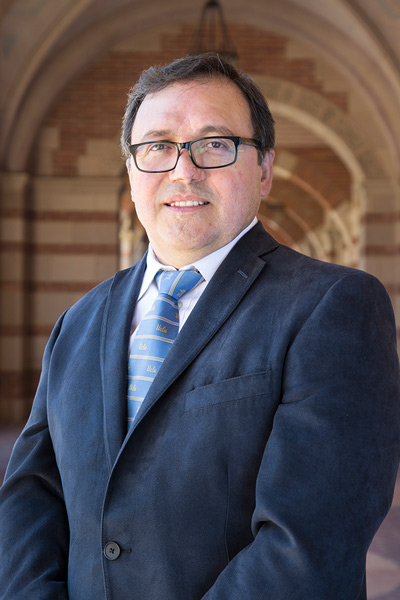
- Born: Morelia, Mexico
- Citizenship: United States
- Education: B.S. (Chemistry, Pharmacy and Biology), 1982, Universidad Michoacana de San Nicolás de Hidalgo; PhD, University of British Columbia, 1988; Postdoctoral fellowship, University of British Columbia, 1988–89; Postdoctoral fellowship, Columbia University, 1989–1992
- Scientific career
- Fields: Solid-state organic chemistry; Solid state reaction mechanisms; Dynamics in crystals; Crystalline molecular machines

Miguel A. García-Garibay is a professor of chemistry and biochemistry and the dean of physical sciences at University of California, Los Angeles (UCLA). His research focuses on solid state organic chemistry, photochemistry and spectroscopy, artificial molecular machines, and mesoscale phenomena.

== Education ==
García-Garibay received his B.S. from the University of Michoacán, Mexico, in 1982. After completing a combined degree in chemistry, Biology, and Pharmacy, García-Garibay went on to get a PhD degree in chemistry at the University of British Columbia, where he joined the group of John Scheffer. After that, he joined the group of Nicholas Turro as a postdoctoral fellow at Columbia University.

García-Garibay received an Arthur C. Cope Scholar Award in 2015.

== Awards and positions ==
- National Academy of Sciences, 2023
- ACS Fellow, 2019
- ACS Cope Scholar Award, 2015
- Appointment to the Chemical Sciences Roundtable of the NAS Board on Chemical Sciences and Technology, 2012–2018
- Associate Editor of the Journal of the ACS, 2009–2016
- NSF Creativity Award, 2009–2011
- American Competitiveness and Innovation Fellow, 2008
- Fellow of the AAAS, 2007
- Herbert Newby McCoy Award, UCLA, 1999
- Dean's Marshal Award for the Division of Physical Sciences, UCLA, 1997
- NSF Career Award 1996–99
