= Paternò–Büchi reaction =

Photochemical reaction

Named after	Emanuele Paternò; George Büchi
Reaction type	Ring forming reaction

Identifiers
Organic Chemistry Portal	paterno-buechi-reaction
RSC ontology ID	RXNO:0000083

The Paternò–Büchi reaction, named after Emanuele Paternò and George Büchi, who established its basic utility and form, is a photochemical reaction, specifically a 2+2 photocycloaddition, which forms four-membered oxetane rings from an excited carbonyl and reacting with an alkene.

Here an electronically excited carbonyl group is added to a ground state olefin yielding an oxetane.

With substrates benzaldehyde and 2-methyl-2-butene the reaction product is a mixture of structural isomers:

Another substrate set is benzaldehyde and furan or heteroaromatic ketones and fluorinated alkenes.

The alternative strategy for the above reaction is called the Transposed Paternò−Büchi reaction.

== See also ==
- Aza Paternò−Büchi reaction - the aza-equivalent of the Paternò–Büchi reaction
- Enone–alkene cycloadditions - photochemical reaction of an enone with an alkene to give a cyclobutene ring unit
