= Transposed Paternò−Büchi reaction =

The transposed Paternò−Büchi reaction involves a ππ* excited state of an alkene reacting with a ground state carbonyl functionality. This is a reversal of the traditional Paternò−Büchi reaction where an excited carbonyl group reacts with a ground state alkene. This strategy was first reported by Sivaguru and co-workers in the reaction of enamides.

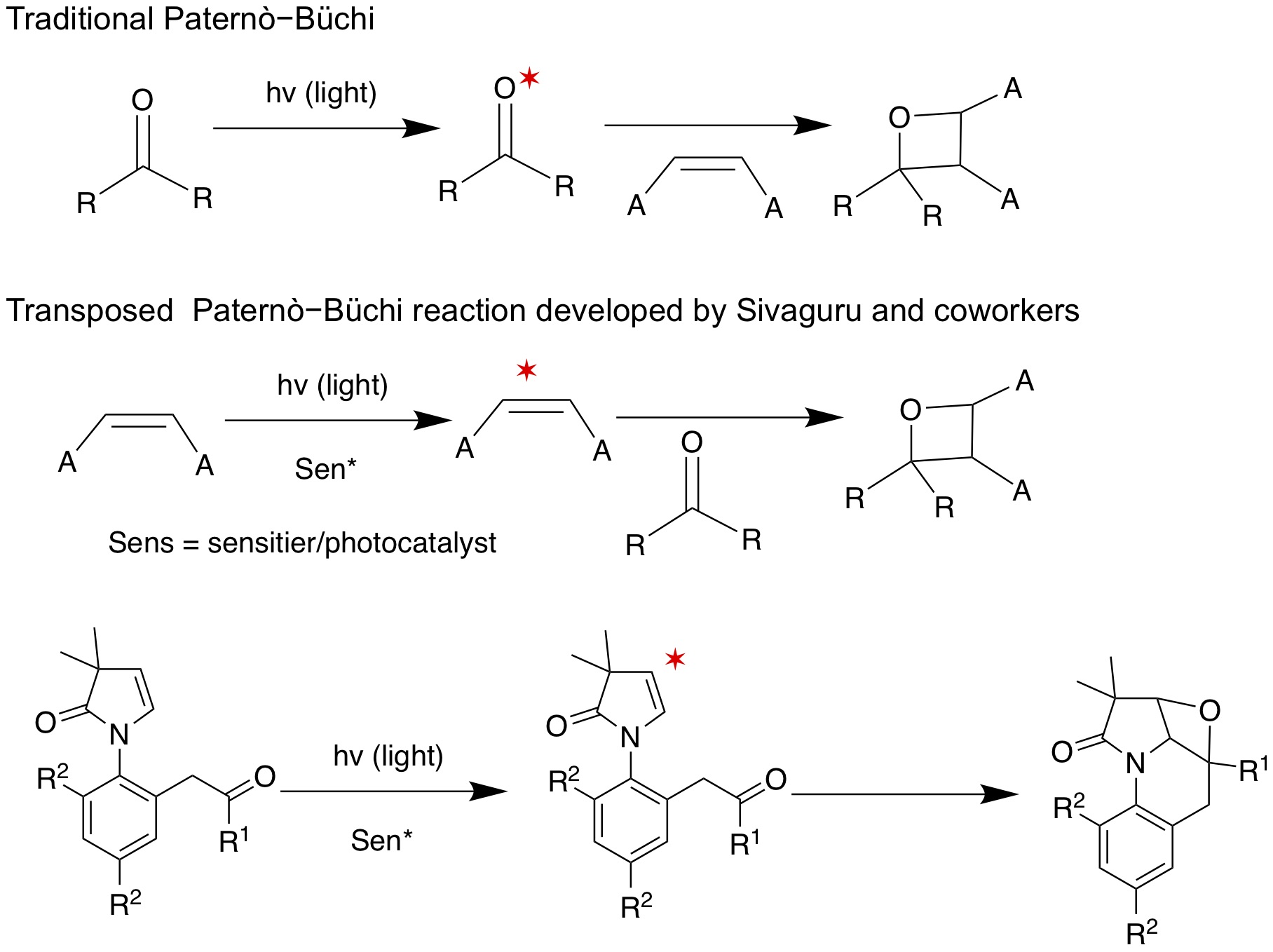
