= Yves Gnanou =

French chemist, academic and author

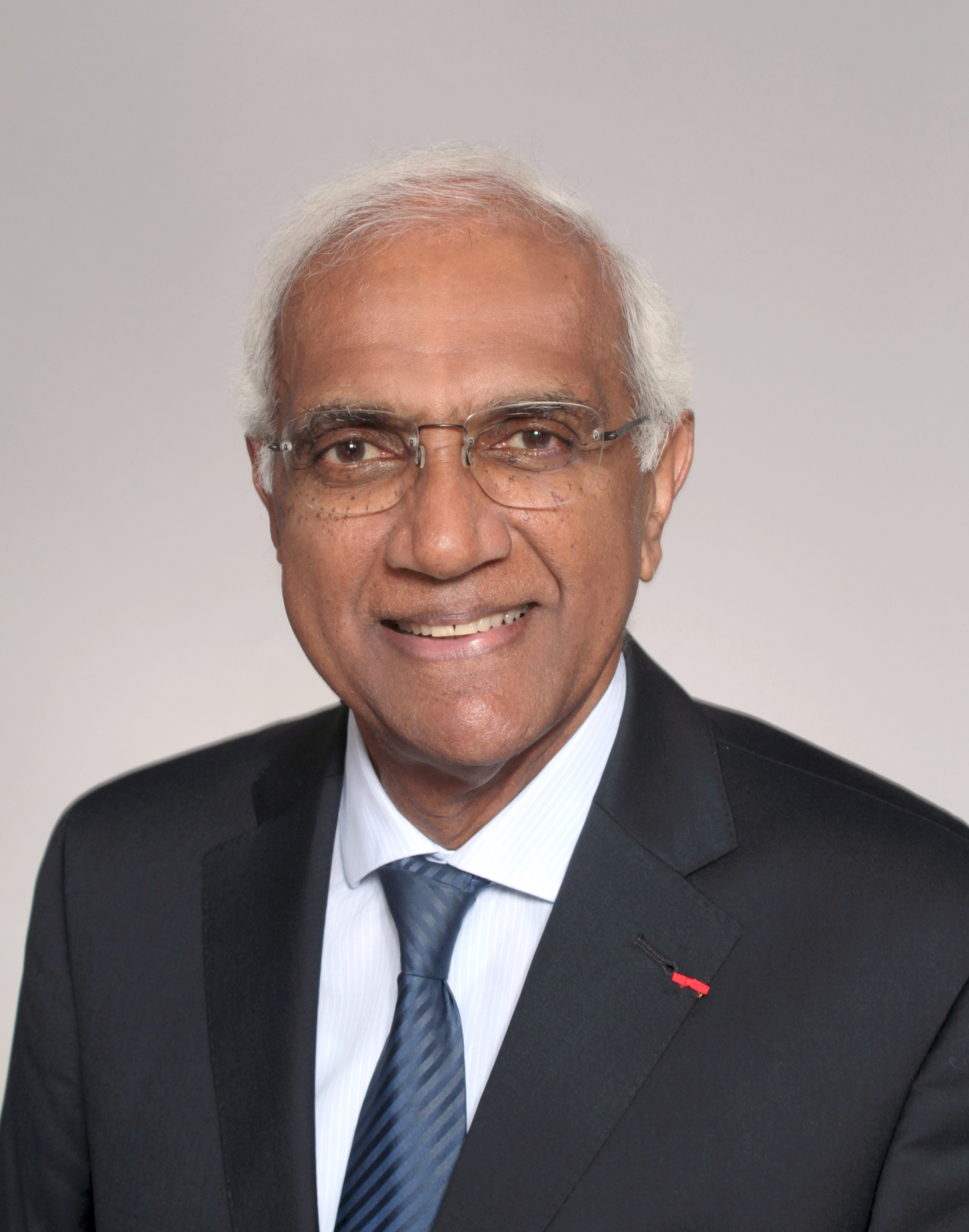
- Occupations: Chemist, academic, and author

Academic background
- Education: Université Louis Pasteur

Academic work
- Institutions: King Abdullah University of Science and Technology

Yves Gnanou is a French chemist, academic, and author. He is the Ibn Alhaytham Distinguished professor of Chemistry at King Abdullah University of Science and Technology.

Gnanou is most known for his works on chain polymerization mechanisms and the creation of diverse polymeric structures using synthesis methods. His research also extends to organocatalysis in polymerization, macromolecular engineering, functional polymers for biomedical uses, living chain polymerizations, polymeric nanoparticles and branched polymers. Among his authored works are his publications in academic journals, including Journal of the American Chemical Society (JACS), Angewandte Chemie, Progress in Polymer Science, Nature Communications, ChemSusChem and Macromolecules as well as books such as Chimie et Physico-Chimie des Polymères and Organic and Physical Chemistry of Polymers. He received the 2003 Langevin Prize from the French Physical Society and the Berthelot Medal from the French Academy of Sciences.

== Education ==
Gnanou completed his M.S. in Polymer Chemistry from the Université Louis Pasteur. Later in 1985, he obtained a PhD in Polymer Chemistry from the same institution.

== Career ==
From 1984 to 1991 Gnanou was a Scientist at the Centre national de la recherche scientifique. During this period, he also served as a visiting professor at the Massachusetts Institute of Technology from 1989 to 1990. In 1993 he was promoted to the Director of Research position at the Centre National de la Recherche Scientifique and was appointed in 1999 as a 1st Class Director of Research. From 2002 to 2007, he was a Courtesy Professor in the Department of Chemistry at the University of Florida. He served as the Chairman of the Polymer Division in the French Society of Chemistry from 2006 to 2009. Since 2012, he has been serving as the Ibn Alhaytham Distinguished Professor of Chemistry at King Abdullah University of Science and Technology.

From 1999 to 2007 he held the position of Head of the Laboratoire de Chimie des Polymères Organiques at Université Bordeaux. He then moved to École Polytechnique (Paris-France) where he served as the Vice-President for Academic Affairs of that institution for five years. In 2012, Gnanou joined King Abdullah University of Science and Technology (KAUST) as the Dean of the Division of Physical Science and Engineering until 2018. He was then promoted to the Vice President for Academic Affairs position from 2018 to 2021.

Gnanou holds patents to inventions involving synthesizing polycarbonates and polycarbamates via chain-growth copolymerization using a Lewis acid, combining CO_{2} with oxirane or thiirane moieties and heteroallene reactants like isocyanates or isothiocyanates.

== Research ==
Gnanou's research portfolio includes articles and books covering areas such as living/controlled chain polymerization, metal-free chemical synthesis, and macromolecular engineering. In 2000, he co-authored a paper in JACS, wherein he investigated the controlled radical polymerization of styrene and n-butyl acrylate using an acyclic β-phosphonylated nitroxide as moderator, examining kinetics, equilibrium, and rate constants, reaching a pseudo-stationary state, and comparing experimental results with PREDICI software simulations. His 2005 study on macromolecular engineering reviewed recent advancements in the synthesis, stabilization, and biomedical applications of copolymer-based nanomaterials, emphasizing the self-assembly of block copolymers and the development of environmentally responsive 'smart materials'. He contributed to the field of organocatalysis with a paper published in 2013, wherein he reviewed the roles of N-heterocyclic carbenes (NHCs) in molecular and polymer chemistry, highlighting their electronic properties, synthesis methods, functional group activation, and their application in metal-free polymer synthesis and as structural components in polymer chains.

In 2016 Gnanou disclosed a method using a binary system associating triethyl borane with onium salts for efficient synthesis of polycarbonate polyols from CO_{2} and epoxides, highlighting high selectivity, productivity, and potential for cost-effective large-scale production. In 2017, he and his co-authors discussed advancements in synthesizing complex macromolecular architectures in polymers using controlled/living polymerization techniques in a review paper. They emphasized the impact of these advancements on polymer physical chemistry, applications, and the inspiration drawn from natural non-covalent chemistry for future developments. Later in 2023, he designed borinane-based bifunctional catalysts with remarkably high activity that could be used in the presence of transfer agents for the same purpose of polycarbonate synthesis.

Gnanou has also authored several books. His 2007 textbooks are titled Chimie et Physico-Chimie des Polymères and Organic and Physical Chemistry of Polymers. Moreover, in 2022, he co-edited the second edition of Macromolecular Engineering: From Precise Synthesis to Macroscopic Materials and Applications. The book covered macromolecular engineering, focusing on the design, synthesis, characterization, and optimization of macromolecules, along with recent advances and applications in the field.

== Awards and honors ==
- 1993 – Polymer Division Award, French Society of Chemistry
- 2003 – Berthelot Medal, French Academy of Sciences.
- 2005 – OSEO-ANVAR award
- 2009 – Member, French Academy of Agriculture
- 2011 – Chevalier dans l’ordre des Palmes Académiques
- 2013 – Chevalier dans l’ordre de la Légion d’Honneur

== Bibliography ==
=== Books ===
- Organic and Physical Chemistry of Polymers (2007) ISBN 9780471725435
- Macromolecular Engineering: From Precise Synthesis to Macroscopic Materials and Applications (2022) ISBN 9783527344550

=== Selected articles ===
- Angot, S., Murthy, K. S., Taton, D., & Gnanou, Y. (1998). Atom transfer radical polymerization of styrene using a novel octafunctional initiator: synthesis of well-defined polystyrene stars. Macromolecules, 31(21), 7218–7225.
- Benoit, D., Grimaldi, S., Robin, S., Finet, J. P., Tordo, P., & Gnanou, Y. (2000). Kinetics and mechanism of controlled free-radical polymerization of styrene and n-butyl acrylate in the presence of an acyclic β-phosphonylated nitroxide. Journal of the American Chemical Society, 122(25), 5929–5939.
- Chécot, F., Lecommandoux, S., Gnanou, Y., & Klok, H. A. (2002). Water‐soluble stimuli‐responsive vesicles from peptide‐based diblock copolymers. Angewandte Chemie, 114(8), 1395–1399.
- Rodriguez-Hernandez, J., Chécot, F., Gnanou, Y., & Lecommandoux, S. (2005). Toward ‘smart’nano-objects by self-assembly of block copolymers in solution. Progress in polymer science, 30(7), 691–724.
- Fèvre, M., Pinaud, J., Gnanou, Y., Vignolle, J., & Taton, D. (2013). N-Heterocyclic carbenes (NHCs) as organocatalysts and structural components in metal-free polymer synthesis. Chemical Society Reviews, 42(5), 2142–2172.
- Zhang, D; Boopathi, S.; Hadjichristidis, N.; Gnanou, Y.; Feng, X. (2016). Metal-Free Alternating Copolymerization of CO_{2} with Epoxides: Fulfilling "Green" Synthesis and Activity. Journal of the American Chemical Society, 138(35), 11117–11120.
