= Hubert Curien Pluridisciplinary Institute =

Multidisciplinary research centre in Strasbourg, France

- Institut pluridisciplinaire Hubert Curien
- Established: 2006
- Research type: Basic
- Field of research: Particle physics Nuclear physics Physiology
- Director: Rémi Barillon
- Location: Bâtiment 28, 23 Rue du Loess, Strasbourg, Alsace, 67200, France; 48.60449°N 7.71201°E
- Campus: Campus of Cronenbourg
- Unit: Joint Research Unit 7178 (UMR)
- Affiliations: University of Strasbourg; CNRS
- Website: www.iphc.cnrs.fr

The Hubert Curien Pluridisciplinary Institute (IPHC—French: Institut pluridisciplinaire Hubert Curien) is a joint research unit (UMR—French: Unité mixte de recherche) of the French Centre national de la recherche scientifique (CNRS) and of the University of Strasbourg. It was formed by the voluntary association of three research laboratories at the University of Strasbourg.

== History ==
The following were the laboratories that joined together to form the IPHC on January 1, 2006:

- Institut de Recherches Subatomiques (IReS)
- Centre d'Écologie et Physiologie Énergétiques (CEPE)
- Laboratoire des Sciences Analytiques et Interactions Ioniques Moléculaires et Biomoléculaires

The institute is named after Hubert Curien.

== See also ==
- Institute for Physics and Chemistry of Materials in Strasbourg
- Institut Charles Sadron
