= European Polymer Federation =

The European Polymer Federation (EPF), established in 1986, is an umbrella organization of national polymer societies and groups in Europe. The goal of EPF is to coordinate, inform about and support the development of polymer science in Europe. As of June 2011 EPF has 24 full members and 5 associate members from 27 countries.

Major activities of EPF is the organization of the European Polymer Congress, conferences, workshops and summer schools, and publishing of e-Polymers - the first on-line peer-reviewed journal in the area of polymer science EPF is led by its chairman, general secretary, executive committee and general assembly. EPF is a non-profit organization.

== European Polymer Congress ==
The European Polymer Congress is a biannual conference organized by the European Polymer Federation. The event has become one of the largest polymer science conferences in the world. The program of the European Polymer Congress encompasses all aspects of polymer science. Traditionally it is organized in the June–July period and lasts for 5–6 days. European Polymer Conferences attract upward from 1000 researchers from academia and industry. The event is organized in the country of the current EPF Chairman.

== e-Polymers ==
e-Polymers is a peer-reviewed internet journal under the auspices of the European Polymer Federation. In the area of polymer science and engineering, it makes novel scientific and technological results available both in academia and industry, and basically free of charge. It has become a respected journal with an ISI impact factor and is followed by major indices.

== EUPOC Conferences ==
Starting from 1998 the European Polymer Federation began organizing Europolymer Conferences (EUPOC) on topics of actual scientific and industrial interest. EUPOC Conferences are small meetings attracting up to 100 participants. The conferences are organized by representatives of the Italian Polymer Society and the traditional venue of the conferences is the Palazzo Feltrinelli in Gargnano (Italy), along the Garda Lake, which is generously made available by the University of Milano. The scientific program consists of invited lectures, oral communications and posters. Ample space is given to the free discussion favored by the residential style of the Conference. Abstracts of accepted papers are collected in a proceedings book which is distributed to all registered delegates.
