= David Andelman (physicist) =

Israeli theoretical physicist

- דוד אנדלמן
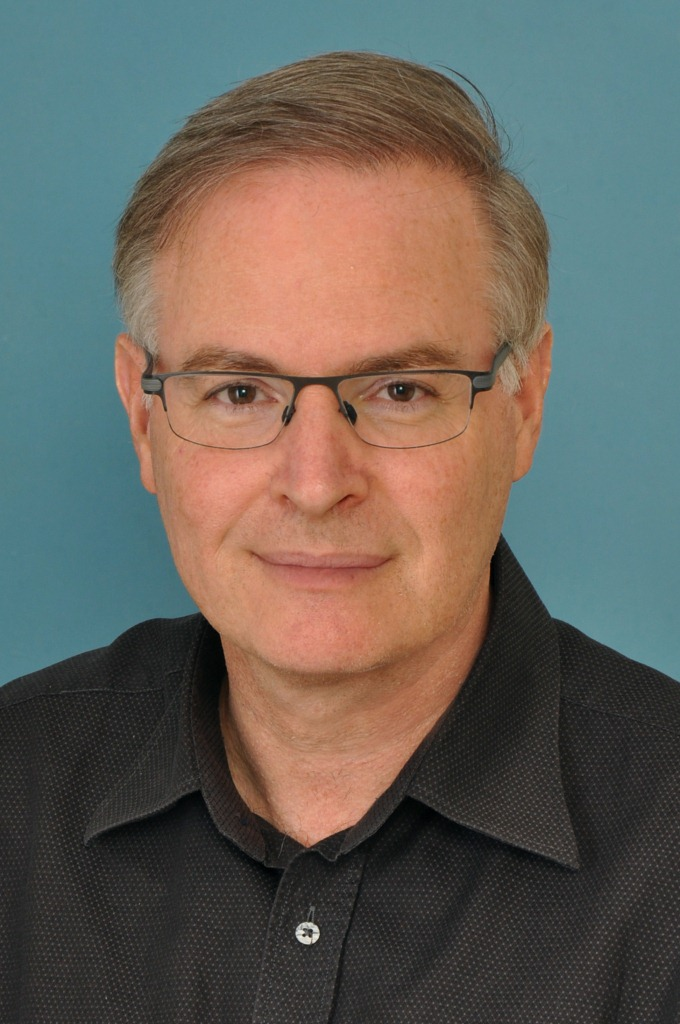
- David Andelman
- Born: 17 October 1955 (age 70); Bucharest, Romania
- Education: MIT
- Awards: Humboldt Prize; Bourke Award
- Scientific career
- Fields: Soft Condensed Matter; Biological Physics
- Institutions: Tel Aviv University
- Thesis: Multi-critical phenomena in systems with quenched and annealed impurities (1983)
- Doctoral advisor: Nihat Berker
- Website: www.tau.ac.il/~andelman

David Andelman, (Hebrew: דוד אנדלמן; born 17 October 1955) is an Israeli theoretical physicist best known for his contributions to soft matter and biophysics.

== Academic background ==
Andelman is the Moyses Nussenzveig Professor of Statistical Physics at the School of Physics and Astronomy, Faculty of Exact Sciences, Tel Aviv University. He received his PhD in 1984 in physics from MIT, and then spent one year (1984–85) as a Joliot Curie Fellow at Collège de France in Paris under the direction of Pierre-Gilles de Gennes, and two years (1985–87) as a post-doctoral fellow at Exxon Research Corporate Laboratories (now CSR, ExxonMobil) in Clinton, New Jersey. In 1987, he joined the faculty of Tel Aviv University and between 2011 and 2015, he served as the chairman of its School of Physics and Astronomy.

== Research ==
Andelman uses theories and models from physics to study soft condensed matter and biological physics systems at the molecular scale. In recent years, his interests are devoted to the understanding of electrostatic effects in soft and bio matter: ionic solutions (electrolytes), charge polymers (polyelectrolytes) and charged biomembranes. Another venue of research is dedicated to directed self-assembly of block copolymers, their patterns and applications in nanolithography.

Andelman served on the editorial boards of several journals including: European Physical Journal E, Soft Matter, Soft Materials (Taylor & Francis), European Biophysical Journal. He is the co-editor of several book series on Soft and Biological Matter.

== Awards ==
Andelman is a fellow of the American Physical Society, recipient of the Bourke Award (2003, Royal Society of Chemistry), Paris-Sciences Chair (2005, ESPCI ParisTech) and the Humboldt Prize (2002, Germany). He was A "Henri de Rothschild fellow" (1993, Curie Institute, Paris), Yamada fellow (1991, Japan) and JSPS fellow (1997, 2002, Japan).
