= Charles Sadron =

French physicist (1902–1993)

Charles Louis Sadron (12 May 1902 – 5 September 1993), was a French physicist who specialized in the study of biological macromolecules.

== Biography ==
Sadron was born in Cluis and studied at the University of Poitiers and later obtained a teaching position at Lycée Kléber in Strasbourg. While teaching at the high school, he obtained his PhD in 1932 at the University of Strasbourg on the magnetic properties of metals under the supervision of Pierre Weiss. He obtained a Rockefeller scholarship afterwards and worked at California Institute of Technology from 1933 to 1934. Sadron returned to France and became a professor at the University of Strasbourg in 1937.

In 1945, Sadron founded the Centre for the Study of Macromolecular Physics (Centre d'Étude de Physique Macromoléculaire or CEPM), which was renamed in 1954, as the Centre for Macromolecular Research (Centre de Recherche sur les Macromolécules or CRM). He was appointed director there until 1967. In 1967, he moved to Orléans where he became head of the Centre de Biophysique Moléculaire (CBM, Center for Molecular Biophysics) at the University of Orléans. Sadron was the first laureate of the Holweck Prize, given by the British Institute of Physics in 1946.

== Institut Charles Sadron ==
In 1985, the CRM and the École d'Application des Hauts Polymères (EAHP, School of Application of High Polymers) were merged into the Institut Charles Sadron (ICS). The Institut Charles Sadron (UPR 22), is a research center of the CNRS (National Centre of Scientific Research), associated with the University of Strasbourg.

== Publications ==
- Dynamic aspect of conformation changes in biological macromolecules, Reidel, 1973.
