= SICM =

SICM is an abbreviation that may refer to:

- Scanning ion-conductance microscopy, a scanning probe microscopy technique that uses an electrode as the probe tip
- Society of Intensive Care Medicine, Singapore-based representative body for intensive care medicine
- Structure and Interpretation of Classical Mechanics, a classical mechanics textbook
