= David Klenerman =

British biophysical chemist

Professor Sir David Klenerman FRS FMedSci
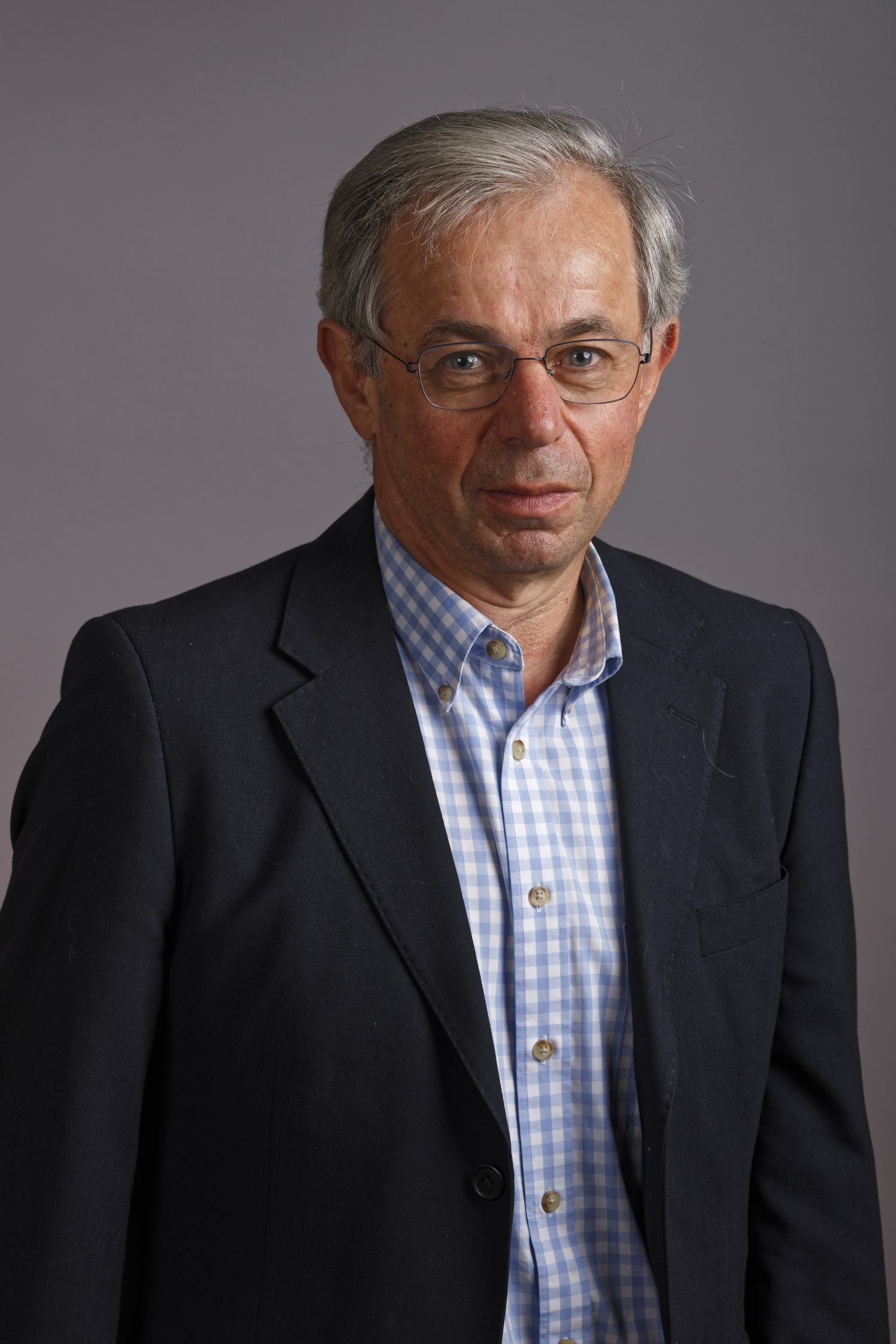
- Born: September 1959 (age 67)
- Education: University of Cambridge (MA, PhD)
- Known for: Illumina dye sequencing Scanning ion-conductance microscopy Super-resolution microscopy Solexa
- Children: 2 (Laura & Anna)
- Awards: RSC Interdisciplinary Award (2007) Royal Medal (2018); Breakthrough Prize in Life Sciences (2022) Canada Gairdner International Award (2024) Wolf Prize in Chemistry (2026)
- Scientific career
- Fields: Biophysical chemistry
- Workplaces: University of Cambridge; Stanford University
- Thesis: Infrared chemiluminescence using a SISAM spectrometer (1985)
- Doctoral advisor: Ian William Murison Smith
- Other academic advisors: Richard Zare
- Website: klenermangroup.co.uk

Sir David Klenerman (born 1959) is a British biophysical chemist and a professor of biophysical chemistry at the Department of Chemistry at the University of Cambridge and a Fellow of Christ's College, Cambridge.

He is best known for his contribution in the field of next-generation sequencing of DNA (that subsequently resulted in Solexa, a high-speed DNA sequencing company that he co-founded), nanopipette-based scanning ion-conductance microscopy, and super-resolution microscopy.

== Early life and education ==
Klenerman is the son of two South African-born Jews. He was educated at the University of Cambridge where he was an undergraduate student of Christ's College, Cambridge and received his BA degree in 1982. He earned his PhD degree in chemistry in 1986 as a postgraduate student of Churchill College, Cambridge and was supervised by Ian William Murison Smith.

== Career and research ==
After his doctorate, Klenerman went to Stanford University as a Fulbright scholar to work on high-overtone chemistry, with Richard Zare. After his postdoctoral research at Stanford, he returned to United Kingdom to work in BP Research for seven years. Then, in 1994, he joined the University of Cambridge, as a faculty member of the Department of Chemistry and a fellow of Christ's College.

Klenerman, along with Shankar Balasubramanian, invented a method of next-generation DNA sequencing which is commonly known today as the Solexa sequencing or Illumina dye sequencing. The method is based on the detection of fluorophore labelled nucleotides as they get incorporated in the DNA strands. This sequencing by synthesis method gained popularity, and is currently regarded as the most widely used platform to replace conventional Sanger sequencing technique, despite its comparatively low multiplexing capability of samples, as it offers several key advantages: it is automated, quick, highly accurate, capable of sequencing multiple strands simultaneously via massive parallel sequencing, and economically cheaper in case of whole genome sequencing.

He is also known for exploring nanopipette-based (instead of conventional micropipette-based) scanning ion-conductance microscopy methods. His research group was successful in achieving very high resolution topographic images of live-cells, in hopping mode imaging, in precise delivery of small molecules to cell, and in studying real time detailed cell-functioning.

Most recently, his group is focusing on 3D super-resolution microscopy to develop new insights on protein misfolding and neurodegenerative diseases.

=== Commercial activities ===
Klenerman and Shankar Balasubramanian commercialised their invention on the single-molecule-fluorescence based high-speed DNA sequencing and jointly founded Solexa in 1998. Later, in 2007, this company was acquired by Illumina for $600 million.

In 2004, Klenerman co-founded another spin-out company, Ionscope, to supply assembled scanning ion-conductance microscopes to the research community that looks for high-resolution 3D images of live cells. As per the Biotechnology and Biological Sciences Research Council, as of February 2014, Ionscope sold 35 SICM units worldwide.

=== Awards and honours ===
The major awards and honours that Klenerman received in recognition of his research work:

- 2007: Awarded RSC Interdisciplinary Award by the Royal Society of Chemistry.
- 2008: Delivered the British Biophysical Society Lecture at the University College Dublin.
- 2012: Elected a Fellow of the Royal Society (FRS).
- 2015: Elected a Fellow of the Academy of Medical Sciences (FMedSci).
- 2018: Awarded the Royal Medal by the Royal Society.
- 2019: knighted in the 2019 New Year Honours for services to science and the development of high-speed DNA sequencing technology
- 2020: Won Millennium Technology Prize along with Professor Sir Shankar Balasubramanian on their innovation of Next Generation DNA Sequencing
- 2021: Won the 2022 Breakthrough Prize in Life Sciences along with Professor Sir Shankar Balasubramanian and Pascal Mayer on their innovation of Next Generation DNA Sequencing
- 2024: Canada Gairdner International Award
- 2024: Novo Nordisk Prize
- 2026: Princess of Asturias Award
- 2026: Wolf Prize in Chemistry
