= William F. Meggers Award in Spectroscopy =

The William F. Meggers Award has been awarded annually since 1970 by the Optical Society (originally called the Optical Society of America) for outstanding contributions to spectroscopy. It was established to honor William Frederick Meggers and his contributions to the fields of spectroscopy and metrology.

== Recipients ==
Year	Winner	Rationale	Notes
2026	Majed Chergui	For pioneering contributions in ultrafast linear and non-linear optical and X-ray spectroscopy and his seminal studies of the electronic and structural dynamics of (bio)chemical systems and materials, which have deeply influenced the fields of chemical physics and materials science.	
2025	John Doyle	For developing pioneering methods enabling a broad range of spectroscopic studies, including cryogenic cooling of large molecules and radicals, novel probes of chirality, slow molecular beams, and laser cooling of large molecules.	
2024	Nathalie Picqué	For pioneering broadband molecular spectroscopy with interfering frequency combs.	
2023	Stephan Schlemmer	For pioneering ultra-sensitive action spectroscopy with fundamental applications to spectra of molecular ions, particularly CH5+, and their key roles in astrochemistry.	
2022	Michael D. Fayer	For seminal developments in ultrafast nonlinear spectroscopy, which have heavily influenced the chemical physics spectroscopy landscape.	
2021	Keith Nelson	For expanding the horizons of impulsive stimulated Raman scattering (ISRS) to the generation of intense tunable terahertz pulses, thus establishing new transient-grating techniques for a more effective application of time-domain coherent nonlinear spectroscopy in the study of condensed phase molecular dynamics.	
2020	Tony Heinz	For seminal studies of the properties and dynamics of surfaces, interfaces, and nanoscale materials by diverse spectroscopic techniques, including through the development of powerful new methods.	
2019	Michael D. Morse	For pioneering systematic studies of small transition-metal-containing molecules, including precise measurements of bond energies by the discovery and exploitation of sharp predissociation thresholds in highly congested electronic spectra.	
2018	Warren S. Warren	For pioneering contributions in the fundamental science of optical and spin coherence and their synergistic applications in optical spectroscopy/microscopy and magnetic resonance spectroscopy/imaging.	
2017	Shaul Mukamel	For developing the theoretical framework of coherent multidimensional spectroscopy for electronic excitations in the optical regime and proposing extensions to the x-ray spectral regime.	
2016	Brooks H. Pate	For the invention of the chirped-pulse Fourier transform microwave technique, which revolutionized rotational spectroscopy, leading to an explosion of novel spectroscopic, astrochemical, analytical, dynamical, and chemical kinetics applications.	
2015	Paul Julienne	For seminal contributions to precision photoassociation and magnetic-Feshbach spectroscopy of ultracold atoms, and the application of these techniques to the formation of cold polar molecules.	
2014	François Biraben	For outstanding achievements in high resolution atomic spectroscopy and metrology of fundamental constants, leading to far-reaching tests of quantum electrodynamics.	
2013	Louis F. DiMauro	For contributions to precision measurements of nonsequential double ionization, exploration of strong field interaction scaling properties from mid-infrared to X-ray and innovative experiments of time-resolved.	
2012	Xi-Cheng Zhang	For exceptional contributions to coherent generation and detection of ultra-broadband Terahertz waves for far-infrared spectroscopy.	
2011	Steven Cundiff	For contributions to the field of ultrafast spectroscopy of semiconductors, including multidimensional Fourier transform techniques, and for contributions to the development of femtosecond frequency comb technology.	
2010	Frédéric Merkt	For ground-breaking work on the ultra high resolution spectroscopy of Rydberg states of atoms and molecules, and for the refinement of high-resolution photoelectron spectroscopy and its application to the determination of the structural and dynamical properties of molecular cations.	
2009	Leo Hollberg	For seminal contributions to the development of diode lasers as powerful spectroscopic tools, development of femtosecond combs, and demonstration of unique quantum effects in the interaction between light and atoms.	
2008	Michael S. Feld	For major contributions to the foundations of laser spectroscopy, and for pioneering developments in the application of spectroscopy to biomedicine.	
2007	Pierre Agostini	For leadership in the development of innovative experiments providing major insights into the dynamics of the non-linear response of atoms and molecules submitted to strong infrared laser pulses.	
2006	Jun Ye	For development of innovative spectroscopic techniques based on femtosecond optical frequency combs.	
2005	Daniel M. Neumark	For pioneering contributions to the molecular spectroscopy of transient species, including transition state spectroscopy by photo-detachment, the development of anion zero-electron-kinetic-energy spectroscopy and time-resolved photoelectron spectroscopy.	
2004	Brian John Orr	For advancing molecular spectroscopy by experiment and theory on infrared- and Raman-ultraviolet double resonance, coherent Raman spectroscopy, cavity ringdown spectroscopy, photoelectron spectroscopy, nonlinear optics, and tunable coherent light sources.	
2003	Daniel R. Grischkowsky	For seminal contributions to the development and application of Terahertz time-domain spectroscopy.	
2002	James C. Bergquist	For seminal contributions to high-resolution, high accuracy laser spectroscopy with applications to fundamental metrology and clocks.	
2001	Frank De Lucia	For pioneering work in the development of the submillimeter-wave region of the electromagnetic spectrum and its application to scientific problems in physics, chemistry, and astronomy.	
2000	Roger E. Miller	For his work in the development and use of high resolution infrared spectroscopy in the study of loosely bonded clusters in the gas-phase as well as in liquid helium droplets.	
1999	David J. Nesbitt	For his experimental and theoretical contributions to the understanding of the molecular structure and dynamics of weakly bound molecules through the use of high-resolution infrared laser spectroscopy.	
1998	William C. Stwalley	For his important contributions to the theory of long-range molecular states, the spectroscopy of alkali-dimer and alkali-hydride diatomic molecules, and the theory of the stability of spin-polarized hydrogen. Recognition is also given to his leadership and teaching in the field of laser science and a lifetime of professional services to the scientific community.	
1997	Takeshi Oka	For his contributions to experimental and theoretical high resolution molecular spectroscopy. As one example, his work on H3+ has revolutionized the field of infrared spectroscopy of molecular ions, but the breadth and quality of his work is such that all aspects of his distinguished career spanning 40 years have had a significant impact in the fields of chemistry, physics, and astrophysics.	
1996	Robert W. Field	For his invention of powerful high resolution spectroscopic methods, including stimulated emission pumping, which have found widespread application. These methods, combined with his definitive studies of perturbations in diatomic molecular spectra, have changed the way we think about molecular complexity.	
1995	Robert N. Compton	For seminal contributions to the understanding of the nature of atomic and molecular negative ions (especially doubly-charged anions) and to the field of multiphoton excitation processes in the gas phase.	
1994	Steven Chu	For pioneering work in manipulation, cooling, and trapping of neutral particles by laser light, and for the first optical spectroscopy of the short-lived laptonicatoms, positronium and muonium.	
1993	Terry A. Miller	For the development of high resolution spectroscopy of molecular ions and radicals and the insightful interpretation of the resulting spectra.	
1992	Joseph Reader	For his outstanding research on complex atomic spectra and spectra of highly ionized atoms.	
1991	Daniel Kleppner	For his outstanding contributions to spectroscopy, including development of the hydrogen maser, spectroscopy of Rydberg states, and analysis of the interaction of atoms with electromagnetic fields.	
1990	David J. Wineland	For his conception of novel, high sensitivity, high accuracy, spectroscopic techniques, their realization, and their application to fundamental measurements.	
1989	Ugo Fano	For his novel analyses of spectroscopic phenomena in the framework of collision dynamics.	
1988	W. Carl Lineberger	For contributions to the basic chemistry, spectroscopy, and physics of atomic and molecular negative ion spectroscopy.	
1987	Hans R. Griem	For outstanding contributions to atomic spectroscopy, especially its application to the understanding of the physics of plasmas.	
1986	Alexander Dalgarno	For contributions to atomic and molecular spectroscopy, particularly in the analysis of problems of astrophysical interest.	
1985	Theodor W. Hänsch	For his discoveries of powerful techniques for high-resolution laser spectroscopy, and their application to fundamental problems of physics, particularly through precision measurements on atomic hydrogen.	
1984	Robert D. Cowan	For his world-recognized contributions to the theory of atomic structure and spectra.	
1983	William Clyde Martin Jr.	For his outstanding contributions to the understanding of the spectra of complex atoms and ions.	
1982	George Series	In recognition of both his theoretical and experimental contributions to a better understanding of the interaction of radiation with atoms, especially for his contributions to the development of the method of quantum-beat spectroscopy.	
1981	Boris P. Stoicheff	In recognition of his innovative use of lasers in spectroscopy, particularly his studies of stimulated and inverse Raman and Brillouin scattering and of highly excited atomic states.	
1980	John G. Conway	In recognition of his leadership in the measurement and analysis of actinide crystal and atomic spectroscopy.	
1978	Robert P. Madden		
1977	Mark S. Fred		
1977	Frank S. Tomkins		
1976	W. R. S. Garton	In recognition of his contributions to atomic spectroscopy, particularly his studies of autoionization, diamagnetic Zeeman effects, and absorption of high Rydberg-series members.)	
1975	Jean Blaise (scientist)		
1975	Emmett N. Leith		
1974	Harry Lambert Welsh		
1973	Curtis J. Humphreys		
1972	Charlotte Moore Sitterly	For seminal contributions to atomic spectroscopy, including extensive studies of the Sun, and tables of atomic spectra and energy levels. (Worked with Meggers on ytterbium and was the first women to receive the award)	
1971	Allen G. Shenstone	For his analyses of atomic spectra of ruthenium and for analyses of atomic spectra in a career covering a period of 45 years	
1970	George R. Harrison		

== See also ==
- List of physics awards
