= Marsha I. Lester =

American physical chemist

Marsha Lester
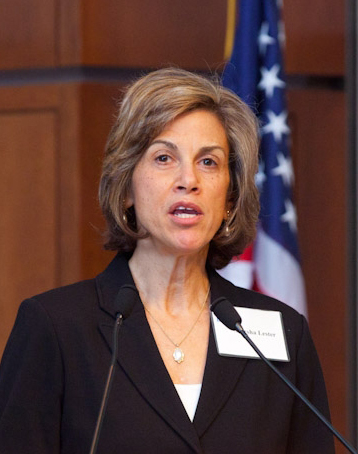
- Lester in November 2010
- Education: Douglass Residential College, Rutgers University; Columbia University
- Known for: Criegee intermediates
- Scientific career
- Fields: Physical chemistry Spectroscopy
- Workplaces: University of Pennsylvania
- Thesis: Vibrational Relaxation Dynamics in Bulk Gases and Supersonic Molecular Beams (1981)
- Doctoral advisor: George Flynn

Marsha Isack Lester is an American physical chemist and the Edmund J. Kahn Distinguished Professor of Chemistry at the University of Pennsylvania. Lester uses both theoretical and experimental methods to study the physical chemistry of volatile organic compounds present in the Earth's atmosphere. Her work focuses on the hydroxyl radical and Criegee intermediates.

== Education ==
Lester graduated from William Allen High School in Allentown, Pennsylvania. In 1976, she received a B.A. from Douglass Residential College, an institution for women at Rutgers University–New Brunswick. In 1981, she earned her Ph.D. from Columbia University in the laboratory of George W. Flynn. Her thesis was Vibrational Relaxation Dynamics in Bulk Gases and Supersonic Molecular Beams. From 1981 to 1982, she performed postdoctoral work as a National Science Foundation fellow at Bell Laboratories.

== Career ==
Lester was the chair of the Division of Laser Science of the American Physical Society. She also worked for American Chemical Society and was the chair of the Department of Energy's Council for Chemical and Biochemical Sciences.

She is currently a professor at University of Pennsylvania in Philadelphia, where she was the first female chair of the department of chemistry from 2005 to 2009. She has been awareded the Edmund J. and Louise W. Kahn Award in the Natural Sciences. She is the founder and currently chair of the Penn Forum for Women Faculty, a group formed to support female faculty at the university. Lester was editor of the Journal of Chemical Physics until 2019.

=== Research ===
Lester's research group utilizes theoretical and experimental approaches to study chemical reactions. She focuses on modeling potential energy surfaces between reactive partners, with an emphasis on volatile organic compounds present in the Earth's atmosphere. She has published extensively on the interactions and reactions of the hydroxyl radical. Lester's group was the first to obtain an infrared spectrum of the hydrogen trioxide radical. Her lab currently works on modeling the stability of this radical and its conformers.

Currently, her group focuses on photo-induced chemistry of Criegee intermediates, an intermediate in the alkene ozonolysis pathway. This pathway is a primary oxidation pathway for alkenes in the troposphere and generates atmospheric hydroxyl radicals. Her lab synthesizes Criegee intermediates in order to further study their chemical reactions using spectroscopy.

Her lab also currently focuses on modeling and observing the collisional quenching of excited hydroxyl radicals. Quenching impacts the concentration of hydroxyl radicals in the atmosphere, and is therefore of environmental interest.

Her research group at the University of Pennsylvania was behind the development of open shell complexes.

== Awards ==
- Herbert P. Broida Prize (2019)
- Member of the National Academy of Sciences (2016)
- Garvan-Olin Medal of the American Chemical Society (2014)
- Fellow of the American Chemical Society (2010)
- Fellow of American Academy of Arts & Sciences (2008)
- Bourke lectureship from Faraday Division of the Royal Society of Chemistry (2005)
- Guggenheim Fellowship (2002–03)
- Fellow of the American Association for the Advancement of Science (1997)
- Fellow of the American Physical Society (1993)
- Alfred P. Sloan Research Fellowship (1987)
- Camille and Henry Dreyfus Teacher–Scholar Award (1986)
