= Michael C. McCarthy =

American chemist and astrophysicist

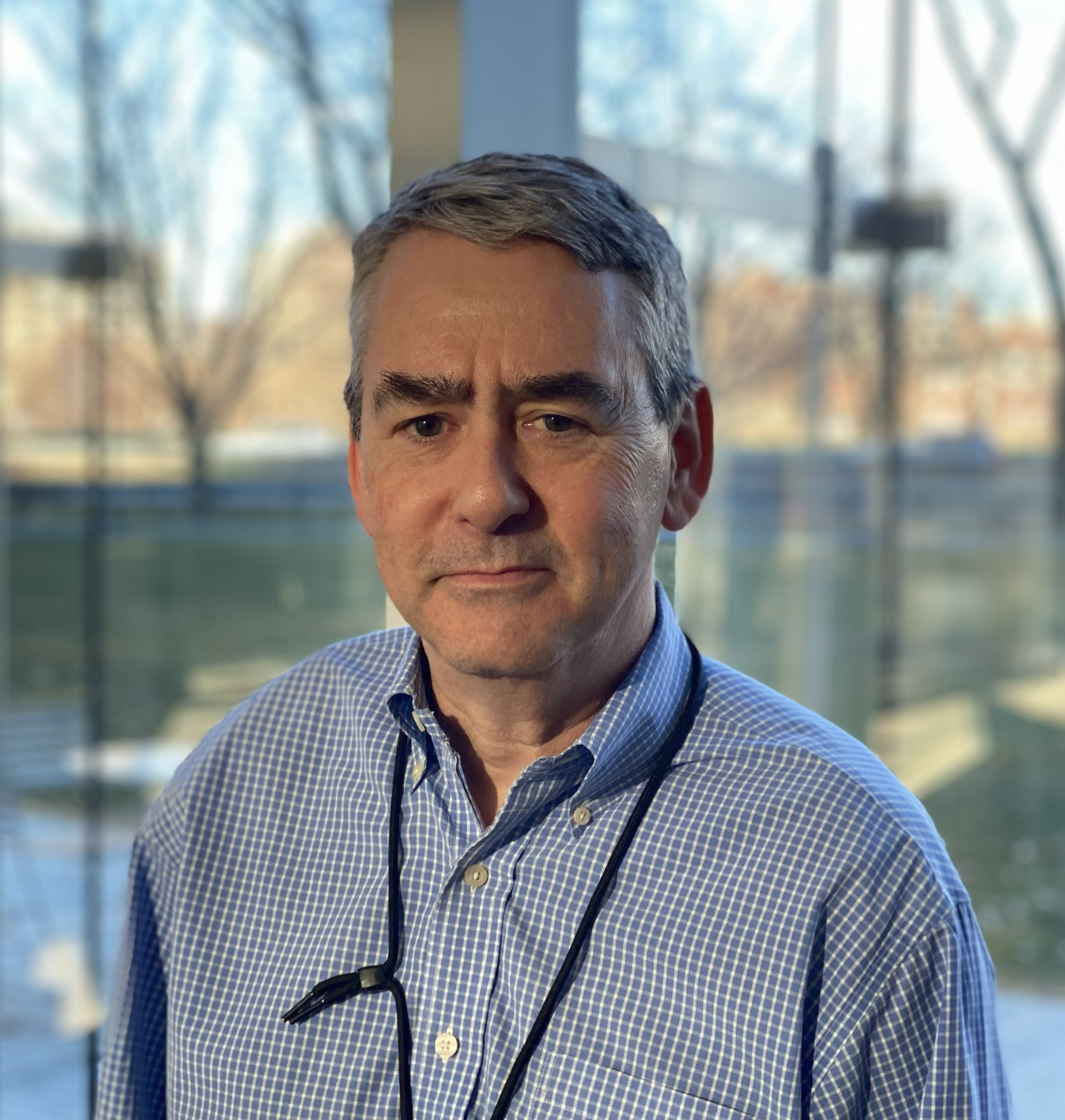
- Education: University of Alaska (BS); Massachusetts Institute of Technology (PhD)
- Known for: Laboratory astrophysics, carbon-chain molecules, molecular spectroscopy
- Awards: APS Fellow (2012); Barbara Mez-Starck Prize (2016); AAS Laboratory Astrophysics Career Prize (2025); AAS Fellow (2026)
- Scientific career
- Fields: Physical chemistry, astrophysics, molecular spectroscopy
- Workplaces: Harvard & Smithsonian
- Doctoral advisor: Robert W. Field

Michael C. McCarthy is an American chemist and astrophysicist. He serves as Deputy Director and Senior Physicist at the Center for Harvard & Smithsonian, where his work focuses on laboratory astrophysics, molecular spectroscopy, and the chemistry of interstellar space.

== Early life and education ==
McCarthy received his Bachelor of Science in chemistry from the University of Alaska in 1986, graduating magna cum laude with a minor in mathematics. He went on to complete his PhD in physical chemistry at the Massachusetts Institute of Technology (MIT) in 1992 under the supervision of Robert W. Field. His doctoral work focused on spectroscopic techniques used to analyze electronic spectra.

== Career ==
After completing his PhD, McCarthy joined the Center for Astrophysics | Harvard & Smithsonian as a postdoctoral fellow, working with Patrick Thaddeus. He remained at the CfA as a visiting scientist until 1997.

In 1997, he joined the scientific staff at the Harvard & Smithsonian and was later named the Yoram Avni Distinguished Research Astronomer. Over time, he held several roles at the institution, including physicist and senior physicist.

In 2014, McCarthy was appointed associate director of the Atomic and Molecular Physics Division, where he oversaw research programs in laboratory astrophysics and related areas. He later served as acting deputy director for a period before being formally appointed deputy director in November 2021. He continues in that role alongside his research work as a Senior Scientist.

== Research ==
McCarthy's research focuses on the experimental study of molecules under conditions relevant to interstellar space. He uses high-resolution microwave and laser spectroscopy to examine the structure and behavior of reactive and short-lived chemical species.

His work includes the identification and characterization of carbon-chain molecules and related species, including negatively charged molecular ions. He has also worked on more complex organic molecules such as aromatic compounds and ring-based systems, which are studied in the context of interstellar chemistry.

In addition, his research covers metal-containing molecules and systems with uncommon bonding patterns. These studies contribute to the set of molecules known to exist in interstellar environments and to their laboratory characterization.

His laboratory measurements are used as reference data in astronomical observations for the identification of molecules in space.

== Honors and awards ==
Among his professional recognitions are:

- Fellow of the American Physical Society (2012)
- International Barbara Mez-Starck Prize (2016)
- NSF Distinguished Lecturer in Mathematical and Physical Sciences (2018)
- Laboratory Astrophysics Career Prize, American Astronomical Society (2025)
- Fellow of the American Astronomical Society (2026)
- CfA Postdoctoral Fellowship, Center for Astrophysics | Harvard & Smithsonian

== Selected publications ==
McCarthy has authored or co-authored more than 270 peer-reviewed papers. Selected publications include:

- McGuire, B. A., et al. (2018). "Detection of the aromatic molecule benzonitrile (c-C_{6}H_{5}CN) in the interstellar medium." Science.
- McCarthy, M. C., et al. (2006). "Laboratory and astronomical identification of the negative molecular ion C_{6}H^{-}." The Astrophysical Journal Letters.
- McGuire, B. A., et al. (2021). "Detection of two interstellar polycyclic aromatic hydrocarbons via spectral matched filtering." Science.
- Changala, P. B., et al. (2022). "Laboratory and astronomical discovery of magnesium dicarbide, MgC_{2}." The Astrophysical Journal Letters.
- McCarthy, M. C., et al. (2000). "Experimental structures of the carbon chains HC_{7}N, HC_{9}N, and HC_{11}N by isotopic substitution." Journal of Molecular Spectroscopy.
- McCarthy, M. C., et al. (2015). "Discovery of a missing link: Detection and structure of the disilicon carbide cluster." The Journal of Physical Chemistry Letters.
- Brünken, S., et al. (2007). "Detection of the carbon chain negative ion C_{8}H^{-} in TMC-1." The Astrophysical Journal Letters.
- McCarthy, M. C., et al. (1997). "Eight new carbon chain molecules." The Astrophysical Journal Supplement Series.
- McCarthy, M. C.; Thaddeus, P. (2001). "Microwave and laser spectroscopy of carbon chains and rings." Chemical Society Reviews.
- McCarthy, M. C., et al. (2021). "Interstellar detection of cyanocyclopentadiene." Nature Astronomy.
