= Journal of Chemical Theory and Computation =

- Discipline: Chemistry
- Language: English
- Edited by: Laura Gagliardi

Publication details
- History: 2005–present
- Publisher: American Chemical Society (United States)
- Frequency: Monthly
- Open access: Hybrid
- Impact factor: 5.7 (2023)

Standard abbreviations
- ISO 4: J. Chem. Theory Comput.

Indexing
- CODEN: JCTCCE
- ISSN: 1549-9618 (print); 1549-9626 (web)
- LCCN: 2004212271
- OCLC no.: 54952713

Links
- Journal homepage; Online access; Online archive

The Journal of Chemical Theory and Computation is a monthly peer-reviewed scientific journal, established in 2005 by the American Chemical Society. The editor-in-chief is Laura Gagliardi (University of Chicago). Originally bimonthly, the journal switched to monthly in 2008.

== Abstracting and indexing ==
The journal is abstracted and indexed in:

- Chemical Abstracts Service
- Current Contents/Physical, Chemical & Earth Sciences
- Embase
- Index Medicus/MEDLINE/PubMed
- Science Citation Index Expanded
- Scopus

According to the Journal Citation Reports, the journal has a 2023 impact factor of 5.7.

== See also ==
- Physical Chemistry Chemical Physics
- Journal of Chemical Physics
- Computational and Theoretical Chemistry
- Journal of Computational Chemistry
- Annual Review of Physical Chemistry
- International Journal of Quantum Chemistry
