= William Clyde Martin Jr. =

American physicist (1929–2013)

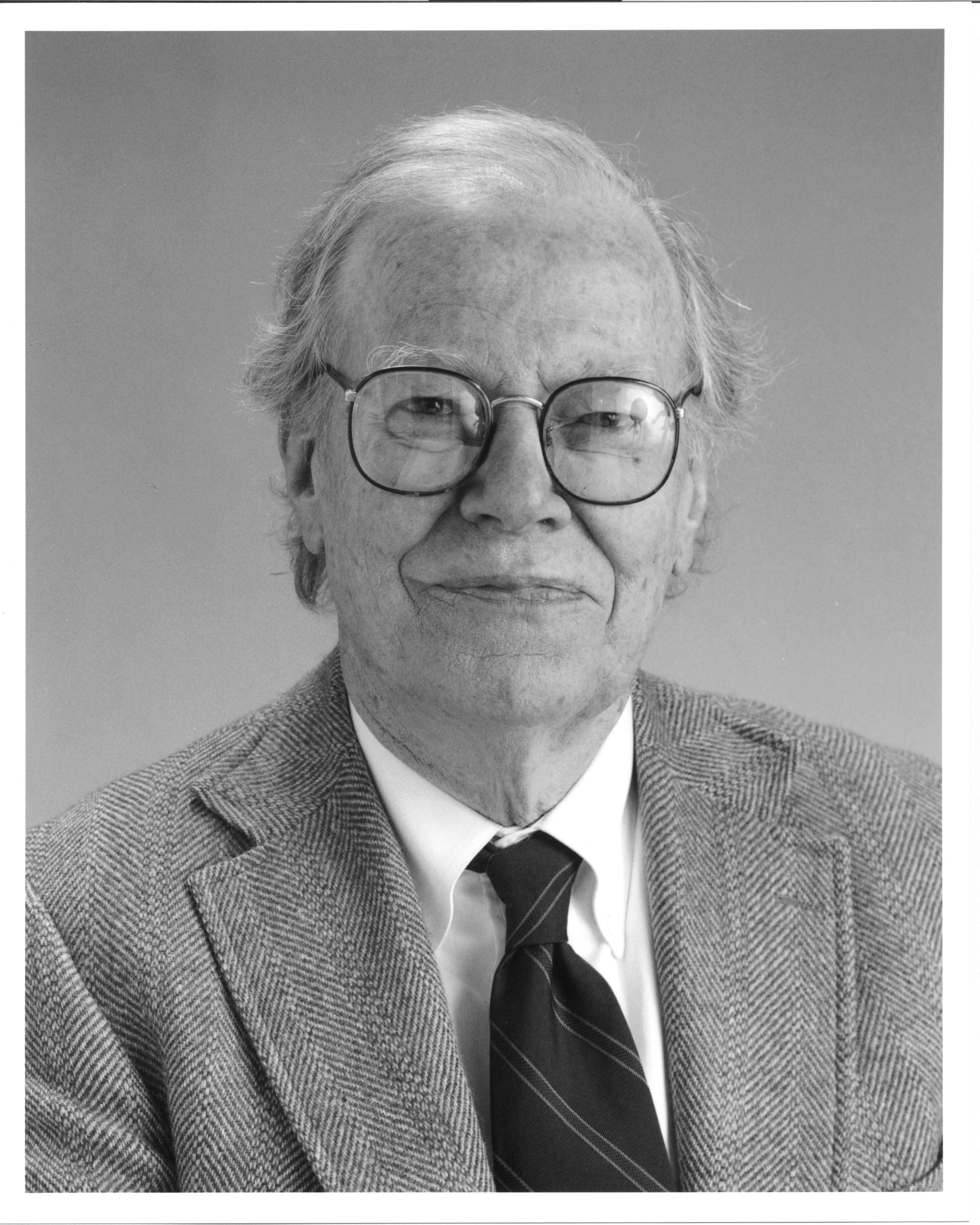
- William Clyde Martin Jr. (1929–2013).
- Born: November 27, 1929; Cullman, Alabama
- Died: September 15, 2013 (aged 83); Washington, D.C.
- Education: University of Richmond (B.S.); Princeton University (M.A.)(Ph.D.)
- Awards: Department of Commerce Silver Medal (1968), Department of Commerce Gold Medal (1981), William F. Meggers Award (1983), Allen V. Astin Measurement Science Award (1992)
- Scientific career
- Fields: Atomic spectroscopy
- Workplaces: National Bureau of Standards, National Institute of Standards and Technology
- Doctoral advisor: Allen Shenstone

William Clyde Martin Jr. (November 27, 1929 – September 15, 2013) was an American physicist. After receiving his Ph.D. degree from Princeton University in 1956, he joined the staff of the National Bureau of Standards (NBS: now NIST, the National Institute of Standards and Technology), where he was employed until his retirement in 1998. As Chief of the NBS Atomic Spectroscopy Section (and its successor organizations) from 1962 to 1998, he led the development of its reference data resources on the spectra of rare-earth elements, substantially increased its coverage of highly excited and ionized species, and pioneered the publication of NIST Standard Reference Data on the internet.

== Life ==
Martin was in born in Cullman, Alabama on November 27, 1929. He received a B.S. in physics from the University of Richmond in 1951 and then pursued graduate studies at Princeton University, where he received a Ph.D. in physics after completing a doctoral dissertation, titled "The energy levels and spectra of neutral and singly ionized phosphorus", under the supervision of Allen G. Shenstone. As a student at Princeton, he had some encounters with Albert Einstein, who lived near his lodgings. Martin served as an instructor in physics at Princeton during 1955–1957. In 1957 he was hired as a physicist by the National Bureau of Standards, where he spent the rest of his career, retiring in 1998 and remaining active as an emeritus member of staff until his death in 2013.

In 1959 he married Dolores Moyano. They had two sons, Eric B. Martin and Christian B. Martin.

== Scientific contributions ==
In 1962, Martin was appointed chief of the NBS Atomic Spectroscopy Section (later renamed the Atomic Spectroscopy Group), and his most influential work was done in that capacity and during his subsequent leadership of its successor organizations until 1998.

The generation, curation and publication of critically evaluated data on atomic energy levels was a major scientific activity of NBS when Martin joined its staff.

That program had resulted in the publication of three landmark monographs Widely known in the spectroscopy community as Charlotte Moore's tables, these monographs, which have been cited over 10,000 times in the scientific literature, tabulated the energies and other properties of atomic energy levels of the elements from hydrogen (atomic number Z = 1) through actinium (atomic number Z = 89), except for the rare-earth elements, cerium (atomic number Z = 58) through lutetium (atomic number Z = 71).

Martin began a long project of analysis of the spectra of the rare earths that resulted in numerous research publications and a fourth monograph, that completed the NBS coverage of the periodic table up to the actinide series. In 1963, he established that the ground level of atomic cerium is of the form 6s^{2}5d4f ^{1}G_{4}°, in standard notation. At the time, it was widely believed that the ground electronic configuration of this element was 6s^{2}4f^{2}, an error that could still be found in reference sources fifty years later.

In the 1970s and 1980s, basic scientific advances, such as laser and plasma spectroscopy, and user needs, particularly those of the nuclear fusion and astrophysics communities, were generating vast quantities of new atomic spectral data and additional data needs, notably those associated with highly excited or ionized species. Martin and his co-workers initiated analyses that covered data from all ions of most second-row elements in the periodic table:

- sodium.
- magnesium.
- aluminum.
- silicon.
- phosphorus.
- sulfur.

The culminating effort of this period was a major atomic spectral compilation, issued in print by NBS in 1985 under Martin's supervision: a 664-page compilation of all data known then, for all ionization stages of the elements potassium (atomic number Z = 19) through nickel (atomic number Z = 28).

At that time it was clear that the vast expansion of atomic data could no longer be adequately disseminated by print publications alone. Many NIST data publications had been converted to magnetic storage media, which could be purchased from the NIST Standard Reference Data Program. In the early 1990s, perceiving the potential of the World Wide Web, Martin persuaded NIST management to allow free distribution of NIST atomic data on the internet. This was the first foray of NIST into free online data distribution, which remains in place today and has since been followed by other NIST data resources.

The most comprehensive of the NIST atomic data products is the NIST Atomic Spectra Database (ASD). First placed online in March, 1995, it was serving about 60,000 page requests per month in late 2013. In addition to his many contributions to ASD, Martin was coauthor of The Handbook of Basic Atomic Spectroscopic Data, which contains data on spectra of neutral atoms and singly charged ions of all elements from hydrogen through einsteinium (atomic number Z = 99). He was also the architect of the NIST Periodic Table: Atomic Properties of the Elements, which has had over 100,000 copies distributed in its print version as of 2013.

Another of Martin's abiding concerns was the accurate description of the spectrum of atomic helium. This spectrum is of particular importance as a calibration reference, a benchmark for theoretical calculations of atomic structure and of quantum electrodynamics effects in atoms, and for applications in astrophysics. Martin's publications on this spectrum, beginning in his early years at NBS and spanning five decades, remain the definitive sources of reference data as of 2013.

== Honors ==
- Department of Commerce Silver Medal (1968)
- Department of Commerce Gold Medal (1981)
- William F. Meggers Award, Optical Society of America (1983)
- Allen V. Astin Measurement Science Award, National Institute of Standards and Technology (1992)
- Office of Measurement Services Award, National Institute of Standards and Technology (1997)
- Fellow, American Association for the Advancement of Science
- Fellow, American Physical Society
- Fellow, Optical Society of America

== Obituaries ==
- Barnes, Bart (15 October 2013). "William C. Martin, National Institute of Standards and Technology scientist, dies at 83". The Washington Post.
- Reader, Joseph; Lide, David R. (2013). "William C. Martin". Physics Today. doi:10.1063/pt.5.6025.
- "In Memoriam: William C. Martin, OSA Fellow Emeritus, 1929–2013". The Optical Society. 2013.
- Reader, Joseph; Lide, David R. (2013). "William C. Martin (1929–2013)". American Astronomical Society. Archived from the original on 19 December 2013.
