= Herbert P. Broida Award =

The Herbert P. Broida Award is awarded every two years by the American Physical Society for outstanding work for experimental advances in the field of atomic and molecular spectroscopy or chemical physics. The prize was established in 1979 and is named after the physicist Herbert P. Broida. The winner receives $5000 and travel expenses to the award ceremony.

== Winners ==
- 1980: Robert W. Field
- 1981: William Carl Lineberger
- 1983: Theodor W. Hänsch
- 1985: Richard Bersohn
- 1987: Steven Chu
- 1989: Stephen Leone
- 1991: David E. Pritchard
- 1993: Curt Wittig
- 1995: Ahmed Zewail
- 1997: William Happer
- 1999: Terry A. Miller
- 2001: David W. Chandler, Paul Houston
- 2003: George W. Flynn
- 2005: Hanna Reisler
- 2007: James C. Bergquist
- 2009: Gustav Gerber
- 2011: Warren S. Warren
- 2013: Daniel M. Neumark
- 2015: Michael Ashfold
- 2017: Tilman Pfau
- 2019: Marsha I. Lester
- 2021: John Doyle (physicist)
- 2023: Lai-Sheng Wang
- 2025: Lucio Frydman

== See also ==
- List of physics awards
