= Daniel Neumark =

American chemist (born 1955)

- Born: 27 March 1955 (age 71); Chicago, Illinois, United States
- Education: Harvard University (BA) (MA); University of California, Berkeley (PhD)
- Awards: Peter Debye Award (2019); Bourke Award (2018); Herbert P. Broida Award (2013); Irving Langmuir Prize in Chemical Physics (2008); William F. Meggers Award (2005)
- Scientific career
- Fields: Physical chemistry
- Workplaces: University of California, Berkeley
- Thesis: High resolution reactive scattering (1984)
- Doctoral advisor: Yuan T. Lee

Daniel Milton Neumark (born 27 March 1955) is an American chemist and professor of chemistry at the University of California, Berkeley.

== Education ==
Neumark obtained his B.A. and M.A. from Harvard University, working as an undergraduate in the lab of Dudley Herschbach. He went on to earn his Ph.D. in physical chemistry from University of California, Berkeley in the lab of future Nobel laureate Yuan T. Lee.

== Career and research ==
From 1984 to 1986 he was a postdoctoral fellow at University of Colorado, in the lab of W. Carl Lineberger at JILA. He currently is a professor at University of California, Berkeley. He was the director of the chemical sciences division at Lawrence Berkeley National Laboratory from 2000 to 2010.

Neumark specializes in the use of ultra-high vacuum techniques (including molecular beams) and photochemistry to characterize the quantum states of elusive or short-lived chemical entities in the gas phase. His research has involved the probing transition states using negative ion photoelectron spectroscopy, investigation of the properties and dynamics of hydrated electrons using time-resolved photoelectron spectroscopy on water clusters. Neumark and fellow Berkeley professor Stephen Leone have collaborated on research probing quantum dynamics using attosecond spectroscopy.

== Awards and honours ==
Neumark won the William F. Meggers Award in 2005, the Irving Langmuir Award in 2008, the Herbert P. Broida Prize in 2013, the Bourke Award in 2018 and the Peter Debye Award in 2019. He is an Elected Fellow of the American Association for the Advancement of Science, American Academy of Arts and Sciences and American Physical Society.
