= Hanna Reisler =

Israeli physicist

- חנה רייסלר
- Education: Hebrew University of Jerusalem; Weizmann Institute of Science
- Scientific career
- Workplaces: University of Southern California; Soreq Nuclear Research Center
- Website: https://dornsife.usc.edu/reisler-lab/

Hanna Reisler (née Bregman, Hebrew: חנה רייסלר) is an Israeli-American Professor of Chemistry at the University of Southern California. She is interested in the reaction dynamics of molecules and free radicals, as well as the photodissociation in the gas phase. Reisler established the University of Southern California Women In Science and Engineering (WISE) program.

== Early life and education ==
Reisler grew up in Israel. She studied at the Hebrew University of Jerusalem, earning her undergraduate degree in 1964. She moved to the Weizmann Institute of Science for her graduate studies, completing her PhD in physical chemistry in 1972. Reisler worked as a postdoctoral fellow with John Doering at Johns Hopkins University. Here she studied the inelastic scattering of ions.

== Postdoctoral Research and Early Career ==
After completing her PhD, Reisler moved to the United States to conduct postdoctoral research at Johns Hopkins University. There, she worked in the laboratory of physicist John Doering.[7][8] Her research at Johns Hopkins centered on the inelastic scattering of ions, contributing to a deeper understanding of energy transfer processes in molecular collisions.[9][10] This early work laid the groundwork for her later studies in molecular beam techniques and the dynamics of transient molecular species.Research and career

Reisler was a researcher at the Soreq Nuclear Research Center. In 1977, she joined the University of Southern California as a research associate with Curt Wittig, before being appointed Associate Professor in 1987. She was a member of the Center for the Study of Fast Transient Processes, which was supported by the United States Army Research Laboratory. Reisler and Wittig worked on gas-surface and solid-state interactions. The first paper she published while at USC was included in James T. Yardley's book on energy transfer. During her tenure at USC, Reisler has worked in the Department of Electrical Engineering, Physics, and Chemistry. She was made a full Professor at the University of Southern California in 1991. In his biography, Wittig described Reisler as "one of the most important faculty members of the College of Letters, Arts, and Sciences, if not the entire University".

She is interested in the molecular mechanisms of chemical reactions. Reisler has looked at molecular transport and guest-host interactions in thin films. Her group at USC has evaluated vibrational pre-dissociation dynamics of hydrogen-bonded dimers and large clusters. She also works on the reactions of diradicals and amorphous solid water. In particular, she has studied chloromethyl radicals, hydroxyl radicals, and NO dimers.

=== Academic service and advocacy ===
In 2000, there were only three women members of the faculty across the USC Viterbi School of Engineering. Reisler founded the Women In Science and Engineering (WISE) program at the University of Southern California. The program was launched with an anonymous $20 million donation, and continues to receive a $1 million per year endowment. She advocated for more comprehensive support for scientists with families. It has since provided fellowships and childcare support for students and postdocs. She created a networking group that meets once a month to share information and resources. She was appointed the Lloyd Armstrong Jr. Chair in Science and Engineering, which looks to advance the careers of women scientists. She is involved with the mentorship of early-career scientists. Her commitment to mentoring has been recognized by the University of Southern California, which launched a mentorship award in her honour. She was honoured by Johns Hopkins University and nominated to their Society of Scholars in 2018.

== Awards and honors ==
- 1991 National Science Foundation Faculty Award for Women Scientists
- 1994 Alexander von Humboldt Foundation Max Planck Research Award
- 1996 American Physical Society Fellow
- 2005 American Physical Society Herbert P. Broida Prize
- 2006 National Science Foundation CAREER Award
- 2007 University of Southern California Remarkable Women Award
- 2010 University of Southern California Provost's Mentoring Award
- 2012 American Association for the Advancement of Science Fellow
