= Chris Cramer (disambiguation) =

Chris Cramer (1948–2021) was a British news journalist and executive.

Chris Cramer may also refer to:

- Christopher J. Cramer (born 1961), American university administrator and research chemist

== See also ==
- Chris Kramer (disambiguation)
