= Frédérique Battin-Leclerc =

French combustion chemist

Frédérique Battin-Leclerc (born 1964) is a French chemist who studies combustion, particularly gas-phase combustion of hydrocarbons including biofuels, in order to develop cleaner-burning automotive fuels. She is a director of research for the French National Centre for Scientific Research (CNRS), affiliated with the Laboratoire Réactions et Génie des Procédés in Nancy, France.

== Education and career ==
Battin-Leclerc was born in 1964. She earned an engineering degree from the École nationale supérieure des industries chimiques in Nancy in 1987, completed a Ph.D. at the National Polytechnic Institute of Lorraine in Nancy in 1991, and earned a habilitation at the National Polytechnic Institute of Lorraine in 1997.

She has been a researcher for the CNRS since 1991.

== Recognition ==
Battin-Leclerc won the CNRS Silver Medal in 2010, and was named as a knight in the Ordre national du Mérite in 2012.

She was elected to the inaugural 2018 class of Fellows of The Combustion Institute, "for innovative research on the formulation of detailed chemical mechanisms for complex practical fuels".

She was the 2022 recipient of the Polanyi Medal of the Royal Society of Chemistry.
