= Akkihebbal Ravishankara =

Ravi Ravishankara ForMemRS FAAAS FRSC
- Born: Akkihebbal Ramaiah Ravishankara; November 16, 1949 (age 76); Shimoga, India
- Education: University of Mysore (BSc, MSc); University of Florida (PhD)
- Awards: Polanyi Medal (1998)
- Scientific career
- Fields: Atmospheric chemistry Air quality Climate change Ozone layer Science policy
- Workplaces: National Oceanic and Atmospheric Administration; Colorado State University; University of Maryland; Georgia Institute of Technology; University of Colorado
- Thesis: The Photolysis, Radiolysis and Mass Spectrometry of 1122-tetrafluorocyclobutane (1975)
- Website: www.esrl.noaa.gov/csd/staff/a.r.ravishankara/

Akkihebbal Ramaiah (Ravi) Ravishankara ForMemRS FAAAS FRSC is a scientist specializing in Chemistry and Atmospheric Sciences, and University Distinguished Professor in the Departments of Chemistry and Atmospheric Sciences at Colorado State University, Fort Collins.

He has been a leading researcher on the chemistry of the atmosphere with special focus on stratospheric ozone depletion, climate change, and air quality. His contributions have been significant in understanding ozone layer depletion, the role chemically active species play in climate change and the lifecycle of pollutants, specifically hydrofluorocarbons (HFCs) and chlorofluorocarbons (CFCs). He was part of the assessment steering committee (2006) of and co-chaired (2010 and 2014) the World Meteorological Organization (WMO)/United Nations Environment Programme (UNEP) Science Assessment Panel on Stratospheric Ozone.

== Education ==
Ravishankara was born in Shimoga, India in 1949. He obtained his BSc and MSc degrees at the University of Mysore, and briefly researched at the Indian Institute of Science, before moving to the University of Florida at Gainesville where he received his PhD in 1975.

== Career and research ==
Ravishankara's work included fundamental research on chemical processes and reaction rates in the gas-phase and surface chemistry of the atmosphere of Earth, resulting in better comprehension of ozone depletion, climate change and air pollutants.

Ravishankara began his career in atmospheric research after obtaining his Doctorate. He has researched Ozone Layer Depletion at Georgia Institute of Technology and in Antarctica. He participated in efforts to find alternatives to CFCs after the passing of the Montreal Protocol in 1987. His work on fully fluorinated greenhouse gases contributed to the Kyoto Protocol agreement in 1997 to reduce carbon dioxide emissions. Ravishankara has also researched extensively on HFCs, work that was part of the efforts leading to the passage of the Montreal Protocol’s 2016 Kigali Amendment, aimed at reducing the use of HFCs specifically.

In 2004, an NOAA team headed by Ravishankara, and two other independent teams, published a significant update of the rate coefficients for airborne chemical reactions. Earlier values were resulting in inaccurate measurement of, amongst other processes, atomic Oxygen reactions, created by the break-down of Ozone. Using laser flash photolysis, the groups studied the reaction kinetics of atomic oxygen with oxygen, nitrogen and hydrogen molecules as well as greenhouse gases. Results indicated that the actual rate coefficient values were 20 percent higher than the estimates used by International Union of Pure and Applied Chemistry (IUPAC) and NASA at the time.

Following research conducted by a team led by him, Ravishankara also drew attention in 2009 to the threat of nitrous oxide to the Ozone layer. In a paper published by the team in Science magazine, their research indicated a steady rise in nitrous oxide emissions by processes arising from human activity like agricultural fertilization and fossil fuel combustion.

Ravishankara was senior scientist and then director of the National Oceanic and Atmospheric Administration (NOAA)'s Chemical Sciences Division in Boulder, Colorado. He also served on the Physical Sciences jury for the Infosys Prize from 2017 to 2019.

=== Appointments held ===
His appointments held include:

- 1976 Research Associate, University of Maryland
- 1976-1985 Research positions at Georgia Institute of Technology
- 1979-1985 Head of Molecular Sciences Branch, Georgia Institute of Technology
- 1984-2014 Research positions at National Oceanic and Atmospheric Administration (NOAA)
- 1989-2014 Adjunct Professor of Chemistry, University of Colorado
- 1993-2007 Chief of Atmospheric Chemical Kinetics Program, NOAA
- 2006-2014 Acting Director and then Director, Chemical Sciences Division, NOAA
- 2014-2016 Professor of Chemistry and Atmospheric Science, Colorado State University - Fort Collins

=== Awards and honors ===
His awards and honors include:

- 1995 Silver Medal, United States Department of Commerce
- 1996 Stratospheric Ozone Protection Award of the US Environmental Protection Agency
- 1997 Fellow, American Geophysical Union
- 1998 Polanyi Medal of the Royal Society of Chemistry
- 1999 Robertson Memorial Lecturer, US National Academy of Sciences
- 2000 Member, US National Academy of Sciences
- 2001 Fellow, American Association for the Advancement of Science
- 2003 Crawford Lecture, University of Minnesota
- 2003 Centenary Lecture, Royal Society of Chemistry
- 2004 US Presidential Rank Meritorious Award for a senior professional
- 2005 Award for Creative Advances in Environmental Sciences, American Chemical Society
- 2005 Chancellor Lecturer, Louisiana State University
- 2005 Fellow of the Royal Society of Chemistry (FRSC)
- 2007 Bronze Medal, United States Department of Commerce
- 2008 Bronze Medal, United States Department of Commerce
- 2008 Administrator’s Award, National Oceanic and Atmospheric Administration
- 2008 Fellow, International Union of Pure and Applied Chemistry
- 2008 Centenary Lecturer, Indian Institute of Science
- 2009 Welch Foundation Lecturer, Texas
- 2009 Morino Foundation Fellow, Japan
- 2010 Hinshelwood Lecturer, University of Oxford
- 2008 Bronze Medal, United States Department of Commerce
- 2013 Harold Schiff Lecture, York University, Canada
- 2013 Randall Lecture, University of Texas at Arlington, Texas
- 2019 Elected a Foreign Member of the Royal Society (ForMemRS)
