= Ian William Murison Smith =

English chemist (1937–2016)

Ian Smith FRS FRSC
- Born: Ian William Murison Smith; 15 June 1937; Leeds
- Died: 8 November 2016 (aged 79)
- Education: Giggleswick School
- Alma mater: University of Cambridge (BA, MA, PhD)
- Spouse: Sue Morrish (m. 1961)
- Awards: Tilden Prize (1983); Polanyi Medal (1990)
- Scientific career
- Fields: Chemistry
- Workplaces: University of Birmingham; University of Cambridge
- Doctoral advisor: Tony Callear
- Doctoral students: Gus Hancock; David Klenerman

Ian William Murison Smith FRS FRSC (15 June 1937 – 8 November 2016) was a chemist who served as a research fellow and lecturer in the Department of Chemistry, University of Cambridge from 1963 to 1985 and Professor of Chemistry at the University of Birmingham from 1985 to 2002.

== Education ==
Smith was educated at Giggleswick School then in the West Riding of Yorkshire and the University of Cambridge where he studied the Natural Sciences Tripos as an undergraduate student of Christ's College, Cambridge. He graduated in 1960 and went on to gain a PhD in 1964 supervised by Tony Callear.

== Research and career ==
Smith was a leading researcher in reaction kinetics, energy transfer and molecular dynamics in gas phase systems. He was elected a Fellow of the Royal Society (FRS) in 1995, a Fellow of the Royal Society of Chemistry (FRSC) and awarded the Tilden Prize in 1983 and the Polanyi Medal in 1990 by the Royal Society of Chemistry. His former doctoral students include David Klenerman and Gus Hancock.

== Personal life ==
He married Sue Morrish in 1961. They had four children.
