= Theodore Goodson III =

American chemist (born 1969)

Theodore G. Goodson III
- Born: April 5, 1969 (age 57)
- Education: University of Nebraska–Lincoln; Wabash College
- Scientific career
- Workplaces: University of Michigan; University of Chicago; University of Oxford
- Thesis: Second and third order nonlinear optical properties of organic polymeric materials (1996)
- Website: Goodson Group

Theodore Goodson III (born April 5, 1969) is an American chemist who is the Richard Barry Bernstein Professor of Chemistry at the University of Michigan. He studies the non-linear optical properties of novel organic materials. He was elected fellow of the American Association for the Advancement of Science in 2012 and the American Institute for Medical and Biological Engineering in 2021. As of 2025, he became a co-editor of the Annual Review of Physical Chemistry.

== Early life and education ==
Goodson completed his undergraduate studies at Wabash College, a liberal arts college in Indiana. He moved to the University of Nebraska–Lincoln for graduate studies, where he majored in chemistry. His research considered the non-linear optical properties of organic polymers. He worked in both the University of Chicago and University of Oxford as a postdoctoral scholar.

== Research and career ==
In 1998, Goodson joined the faculty at Wayne State University. He moved to the University of Michigan as a professor of chemistry in 2004. He demonstrated that ultrafast laser spectroscopy could be used to better understand materials for solar energy. In particular, he was building highly branched macromolecules. Whilst studying these macromolecules, Goodson and his co-worker Guo noticed that a hyperbranched phthalocyanine compound exhibited large and delocalized polarization. When voltages were applied to these phthalocyanines, charge carriers hopped around the structure. These phthalocyanines had high dielectric constants, which indicated that they would be better suited as the dielectric medium inside capacitors. In 2010, he became chief science officer for Wolverine Energy Solutions & Technology. The spin-out company uses organic energy storage materials to make capacitors.

Starting in 2006, Goodson published research on entangled two-photon absorption (E2PA). The 2006 paper reported that entangled photons produced through spontaneous parametric down conversion (SPDC) possessed a 10^{31} times higher excitation rate as compared to the corresponding classical TPA process in a dendrimer material. A subsequent publication reported 10 orders of magnitude enhancement in a variety of small molecules. In addition to these two reports, Goodson has published over 15 letters/articles (not including reviews) claiming to measure and utilize E2PA. These reports have been disputed by academics.

== Awards and honors ==
- 2011 Percy L. Julian Award
- 2012 Elected Fellow of the American Association for the Advancement of Science
- 2012 University of Michigan Distinguished Faculty Achievement Award
- 2012 California State University, Los Angeles Lloyd Ferguson Distinguished Lecturer
- 2013 Sigma Xi Distinguished Lecturer
- 2014 American Chemical Society Fellow from the Physical Chemistry Division
- 2021 Elected to the American Institute for Medical and Biological Engineering
- 2021-2022 Hagler Fellow
- 2024 Robert Holland Jr. Award (inaugural awardee)
- 2024 Award in Experimental Physical Chemistry (ACS)

== Selected publications ==
- Sung Hei Yau; Oleg Varnavski; Theodore Goodson (2013). "An ultrafast look at Au nanoclusters". Accounts of Chemical Research. 46 (7): 1506–1516. doi:10.1021/ar300280w. PMID 23651457. Wikidata Q34708859.
- Ajit Bhaskar; Ramakrishna Guda; Michael M. Haley; Goodson (2006). "Building Symmetric Two-Dimensional Two-Photon Materials". Journal of the American Chemical Society. 128 (43): 13972–13973. doi:10.1021/ja062709x. PMID 17061848. Wikidata Q29544237.
- Oleg Varnavski; Neranga Abeyasinghe; Aragó, Juan; et al. (2015). "High Yield Ultrafast Intramolecular Singlet Exciton Fission in a Quinoidal Bithiophene". The Journal of Physical Chemistry Letters. 6 (8): 1375–1384. doi:10.1021/acs.jpclett.5b00198. PMID 26263138. Wikidata Q51813453.

== Personal life ==
Goodson is married to physician Stephanie Goodson.
