= Benton Seymour Rabinovitch =

Seymour Rabinovitch
- Born: Benton Seymour Rabinovitch; 19 February 1919; Montreal
- Died: 2 August 2014 (aged 95); Seattle, Washington
- Education: McGill University
- Known for: Detection methods for chemical warfare agents Understanding rates of gas phase chemical reactions Silversmithing
- Awards: Polanyi Medal (1984); Peter Debye Award (1984); Fellow of the Royal Society (1987)
- Scientific career
- Fields: Chemistry
- Workplaces: University of Washington
- Thesis: Studies in chemical kinetics (academic research) and the detection of vesicants (war research) (1942)

(Benton) Seymour Rabinovitch (19 February 1919 – 2 August 2014) was a professor of chemistry at the University of Washington in Seattle, whose research including developing measurements for the efficiency with which energy is transferred between molecules in gas phase chemical reactions. Rabinovitch was an editor of the Annual Review of Physical Chemistry and of the Journal of the American Chemical Society.

After formally retiring, Rabinovitch became a silversmith, studying the chemistry of silver and collecting and writing about silver. In 2000, Rabinovitch became an Honorary Liveryman of the Worshipful Company of Goldsmiths in London. His collection of silver slicers and servers became part of the Victoria and Albert Museum's permanent collection in 2005.

== Career ==
Benton Seymour Rabinovitch was born to Rochelle (Schacter) and Samuel Rabinovitch, both immigrants to Montreal, Canada. In spite of the financial difficulties resulting from the Great Depression and anti-Jewish educational quotas, Benton Rabinovitch earned his BSc from McGill University in 1939, and his PhD in 1942. His Ph.D. topic was Studies in chemical kinetics (academic research) and the detection of vesicants (war research).

Rabinovitch joined the Canadian government's Chemical Warfare Laboratory in Ottawa, initially as a civilian. He was subsequently sent to an officer's training camp in December 1942, and then was sent to England to serve as a Captain in the Chemical Warfare Division of the Canadian Army in 1943. Building on his Ph.D. work. Rabinovitch was able to develop a simple method for detecting the chemical warfare agent mustard gas. In Rabinovitch's method, cloth swatches were treated with dyestuffs and worn on clothing. The resulting indicators changed color in the presence of mustard gas, warning soldiers of its presence. After D-Day, Rabinovitch's unit landed at Courseulles-sur-Mer, France. He and his team of scientists were tasked with examining German factories and battlefields in order to collect evidence of violations of the Geneva Convention on Weaponry.

After World War I ended, Rabinovitch taught briefly at Khaki College in Watford, England. He then obtained a postdoctoral fellowship in physical chemistry with Professor George Kistiakowsky at Harvard University.

He joined the faculty of University of Washington in Seattle as an assistant professor of chemistry in 1948. He became a full professor in 1957.

Over four decades, Rabinovitch established himself as a leader in the field of chemical dynamics. He and his students devised novel means to determine quantitative measurements of the efficiency of energy transfer between molecules in collisions: both gas-phase molecule–molecule collisions and collisions between molecules and solid surfaces. He established correlations between vibrational energy in molecules and rates of chemical reactions. He was the first researcher to experimentally validate important theories in physical chemistry such as the Rice–Ramsperger–Kassel–Marcus (RRKM) theory. His experiments and the mathematical techniques that he developed have contributed to the understanding of chemical kinetics, molecular dynamics, and gas-phase ion chemistry.

From 1977–1985, Rabinovitch was the editor of the Annual Review of Physical Chemistry. He was also an editor for the Journal of the American Chemical Society and served as Chair of the Division of Physical Chemistry for the American Chemical Society. Following his formal retirement from academia, Rabinovitch retained academic status as Professor Emeritus in 1986, and continued to scientific experimentation, writing and publishing.

== Silversmithing ==
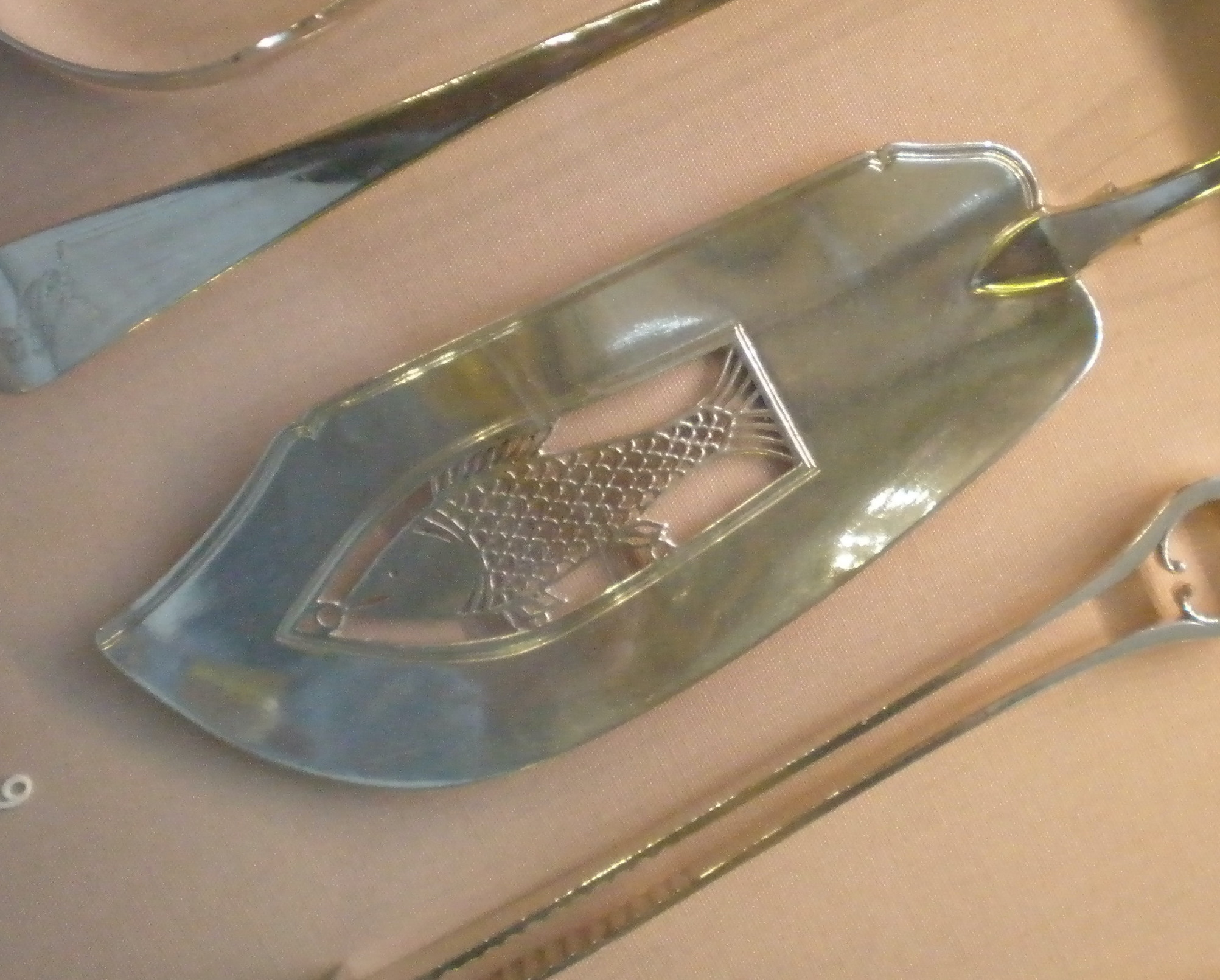
Silver Fish Slice, 1814-15 by W & S Knight, Victoria and Albert Museum

After retiring from the University of Washington in 1986, Rabinovitch became a silversmith and studied the chemistry of silver. He was particularly fascinated by antique silver slicers and servers, which he collected.

He wrote authoritatively on their history and chemistry, including the books Antique Silver Servers for the Dining Table: Style, Function, Food and Social History (1991) and Contemporary Silver: Commissioning, Designing, Collecting (2000). He published in magazines such as Silver Magazine, Silver Society Journal and Metalsmith. Rabinovitch was a member of the Silver Society of London. In 2000, Rabinovitch became an Honorary Liveryman of the Worshipful Company of Goldsmiths.

As a patron of silversmithing, Rabinovitch commissioned the creation of more than 60 cake, pudding, and fish-servers from artists in the U.S. and Britain. His collection of silver servers has been the basis for a number of exhibitions, the first of which was Slices of silver at Goldsmiths' Hall in London in 1995. Later exhibitions include the Schneider Museum of Art in 1998 and 2003; the Winnipeg Art Gallery, Canada; the Aberdeen Art Gallery, Scotland; and the National Ornamental Metal Museum, Memphis, Tennessee. His collection was given to London's Victoria and Albert Museum in 2005, becoming part of its permanent collection.

== Personal life ==
Rabinovitch married Marilyn Werby of Boston in 1949. They had four children. Marilyn died in 1974 due to cancer. In 1980, Rabinovitch married Flora Reitman of Montreal, Canada. He published a children's book, Higgledy piggledy: a tale of four little pigs (2013) based on stories he had told his children.

As a philanthropist Rabinovitch established an annual purchase award, later an endowment, to enable the University of Washington's Metals Program to acquire student pieces. The Marilyn Werby Rabinovitch Memorial Fund for the School of Art Metals Program continued from 1993 to 2008, resulting in the Marilyn Werby Rabinovitch Purchase Award Collection.

Seymour Rabinovitch died on August 2, 2014, in Seattle, Washington.

== Awards and honours ==
- 1968, Fellow of the American Physical Society (APS)
- 1979, Fellow of the American Academy of Arts and Sciences (AAAS)
- 1984, Peter Debye Award, American Chemical Society (ACS)
- 1984, Polanyi Medal, Royal Society
- 1987, Fellow of the Royal Society
- 1991, Honorary Doctorate of Science, Technion – Israel Institute of Technology
