= Peter Debye Award =

The Peter Debye Award in Physical Chemistry is awarded annually by the American Chemical Society "to encourage and reward outstanding research in physical chemistry". The award is named after Peter Debye and granted without regard to age or nationality.

== Recipients ==
- 2025 Sharon Glotzer
- 2021 Michael David Fayer
- 2020 Laura Gagliardi
- 2019 Daniel M. Neumark
- 2018 Paras Nath Prasad
- 2017 Bruce J. Berne
- 2016 Mark A. Ratner
- 2015 Xiaoliang Sunney Xie
- 2014 Henry F. Schaefer III
- 2013 William E. Moerner
- 2012 David Chandler
- 2011 Louis E. Brus
- 2010 George Schatz
- 2009 Richard J. Saykally
- 2008 Michael L. Klein
- 2007 John T. Yates, Jr.
- 2006 Donald Truhlar
- 2005 Stephen Leone
- 2004 William Carl Lineberger
- 2003 William H. Miller
- 2002 Giacinto Scoles
- 2001 John Ross
- 2000 Peter G. Wolynes
- 1999 Jesse L. Beauchamp
- 1998 Graham R. Fleming
- 1997 Robin M. Hochstrasser
- 1996 Ahmed Zewail
- 1995 John C. Tully
- 1994 William A. Klemperer
- 1993 F. Sherwood Rowland
- 1992 Frank H. Stillinger
- 1991 Richard N. Zare
- 1990 Harden M. McConnell
- 1989 Gabor A. Somorjai
- 1988 Rudolph A. Marcus
- 1987 Harry G. Drickamer
- 1986 Yuan T. Lee
- 1985 Stuart A. Rice
- 1984 B. Seymour Rabinovitch
- 1983 George C. Pimentel
- 1982 Peter M. Rentzepis
- 1981 Richard B. Bernstein
- 1976 Robert W. Zwanzig
- 1975 Herbert S. Gutowsky
- 1974 Walter H. Stockmayer
- 1973 William N. Lipscomb, Jr.
- 1972 Clyde A. Hutchison, Jr.
- 1971 Norman Davidson
- 1970 Oscar K. Rice
- 1969 Paul J. Flory
- 1968 George B. Kistiakowsky
- 1967 Joseph E. Mayer
- 1966 Joseph O. Hirschfelder
- 1965 Lars Onsager
- 1964 Henry Eyring
- 1963 Robert S. Mulliken
- 1962 E. Bright Wilson, Jr.

== See also ==
- List of chemistry awards
