= Julie Theriot =

American microbiologist

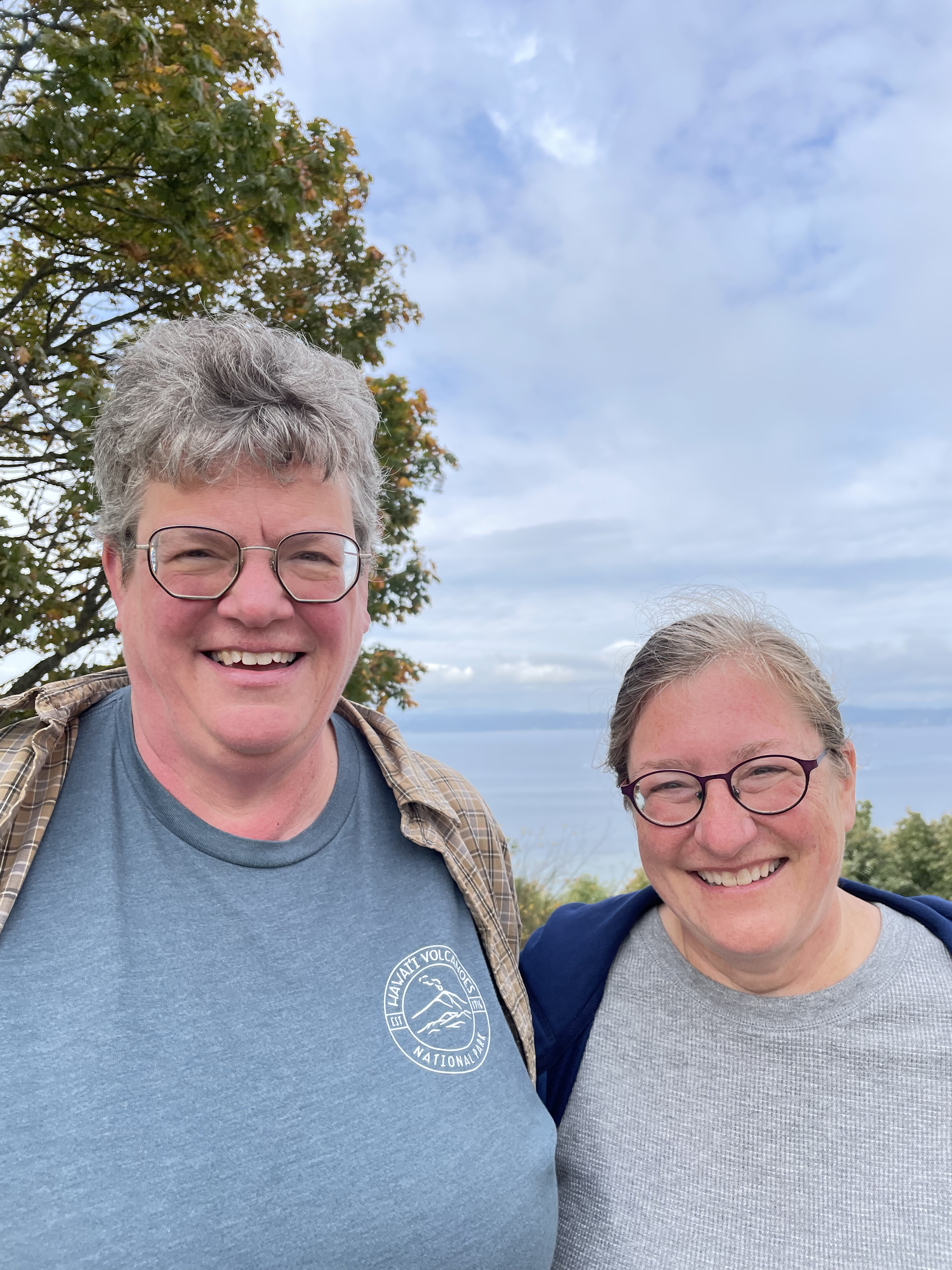
- Theriot (right) and Anne B. McCoy (left) on a hike at Discovery Park (Seattle) in 2025
- Born: 1967 (age 58–59)
- Education: Massachusetts Institute of Technology, University of California, San Francisco
- Awards: MacArthur Fellows Program
- Scientific career
- Fields: Biomechanics, Cell Biology
- Workplaces: University of Washington, Allen Institute for Cell Science

Julie A. Theriot (/ˈtɛrioʊ/; born 1967) is a cell biologist, who studies the molecular mechanics and dynamics of cell movement and organization. Her work spans many fields from microbiology to biophysics, and lab studies eukaryotic cell motility as well as the hijacking of the cytoskeleton by intracellular parasites like listeria. She has also published work that describes the mechanisms of Galvanotaxis in vertebrate cells. She is a professor at the University of Washington, Department of Biology, a continuing Howard Hughes Medical Institute (HHMI) Investigator, and Chief Scientific Advisor at the Allen Institute for Cell Science. She was previously a professor at the Stanford University School of Medicine, and before that, she was a Predoctoral Fellow and Investigator at HHMI. She was also a fellow at the Whitehead Institute for Biomedical Research.

She graduated from the Massachusetts Institute of Technology with a B.S. in Biology and Physics in 1988, and from the University of California, San Francisco, with a Ph.D. in Cell Biology in 1993. Her work has investigated bacterial infections, such as Shigella, and Listeria.

== Awards ==
- 2004 MacArthur Fellows Program
- 2019 Keith R. Porter Lecture
- 2021 Member of the U. S. National Academy of Sciences.

== Works ==
- "Mechanism for cell shapeliness decoded from fish scales", Nature 453, xi (22 May 2008)
- Physical biology of the cell, Authors Rob Phillips, Janè Kondev, Julie Theriot, Garland Science, 2008, ISBN 978-0-8153-4163-5
- "Bacterial Manipulation of the Host Cell Cytoskeleton", Cellular microbiology, Editor Pascale Cossart, ASM Press, 2005, ISBN 978-1-55581-302-4
- "Movement of Bacterial Pathogens Driven by Actin Polymerization", Motion analysis of living cells, Editors David R. Soll, Deborah Wessels, Wiley-IEEE, 1998, ISBN 978-0-471-15915-5
