= Mark A. Johnson =

- Education: Stanford University
- Scientific career
- Fields: Physical chemistry
- Workplaces: Yale University

Mark A. Johnson is an American physical chemist and a professor of chemistry at Yale University. He received his Ph.D. at Stanford University in 1983.

Johnson is a co-editor of Annual Review of Physical Chemistry beginning with its 2012 issue. He became a Fellow of the American Physical Society in 1999, a Fellow of the American Association for the Advancement of Science in 2005, a Fellow of the American Academy of Arts and Sciences in 2009, and a Fellow of the American Chemical Society in 2010. He received the Alexander von Humboldt Senior Research Award in 2012. He is the 2014 recipient of the Irving Langmuir Award. He is also a member of the United States National Academy of Sciences.
