= Paul Houston (chemist) =

American chemist

Paul Lyon Houston
- Born: January 27, 1947 (age 79); Hartford, Connecticut, USA
- Education: Yale University; MIT
- Scientific career
- Institutions: Cornell University; Georgia Tech
- Doctoral advisor: Jeffrey I. Steinfeld
- Website: houston.chem.cornell.edu/hrghome.html

Paul Lyon Houston (born January 27, 1947) is Professor Emeritus of Chemistry at Cornell University.

== Education and career ==
Houston started his professorial career at Cornell University in 1975 following undergraduate study at Yale University, doctoral work at MIT, and postdoctoral research at the University of California at Berkeley. He became chair of Cornell's department of chemistry and chemical biology (1997–2001), senior associate dean of the college of arts and sciences (2002–2005), and the Peter J. W. Debye Professor of Chemistry. Most recently, he was dean of the college of sciences at Georgia Tech (from 2007-2013).

Houston was a member of the Cornell Center for Materials Research, the Kavli Institute at Cornell for Nanoscale Science, and the Graduate Field of Applied Physics. Houston has held visiting positions at the Max Planck Institute for Quantum Optics (1982), Columbia University (1986, 1987), the Institute for Molecular Science, Okazaki, Japan (1989), the University of California at Berkeley (2003), and the University of Rome La Sapienza (2001, 2006). He has been an Alfred P. Sloan Research Fellow (1979–81), a Camille and Henry Dreyfus Teacher Scholar (1980), and a John Simon Guggenheim Fellow (1986–87).

Houston served as a senior editor of the Journal of Physical Chemistry (1991–97), as chair of the American Physical Society Division of Laser Chemistry (1997–98), and as a member of the science and technology steering committee of Brookhaven National Laboratories (1998–2005). Houston has authored or co-authored over 160 publications in the field of physical chemistry and a textbook on chemical kinetics.

== Honors and awards ==
Houston was elected a Fellow of the American Physical Society in 1989 for "important contributions toward understanding molecular photodissociation dynamics, energy transfer, and gas-solid interactions; in particular, for his imaginative use of photofragment imaging and his development of the field of vector correlations".

In 2001, Houston shared with David W. Chandler the Herbert P. Broida Prize of the American Physical Society for work on product imaging in chemical dynamics. He was elected a fellow of the American Academy of Arts and Sciences in 2003.
