= Anne McCoy =

Theoretical chemist

Anne B. McCoy
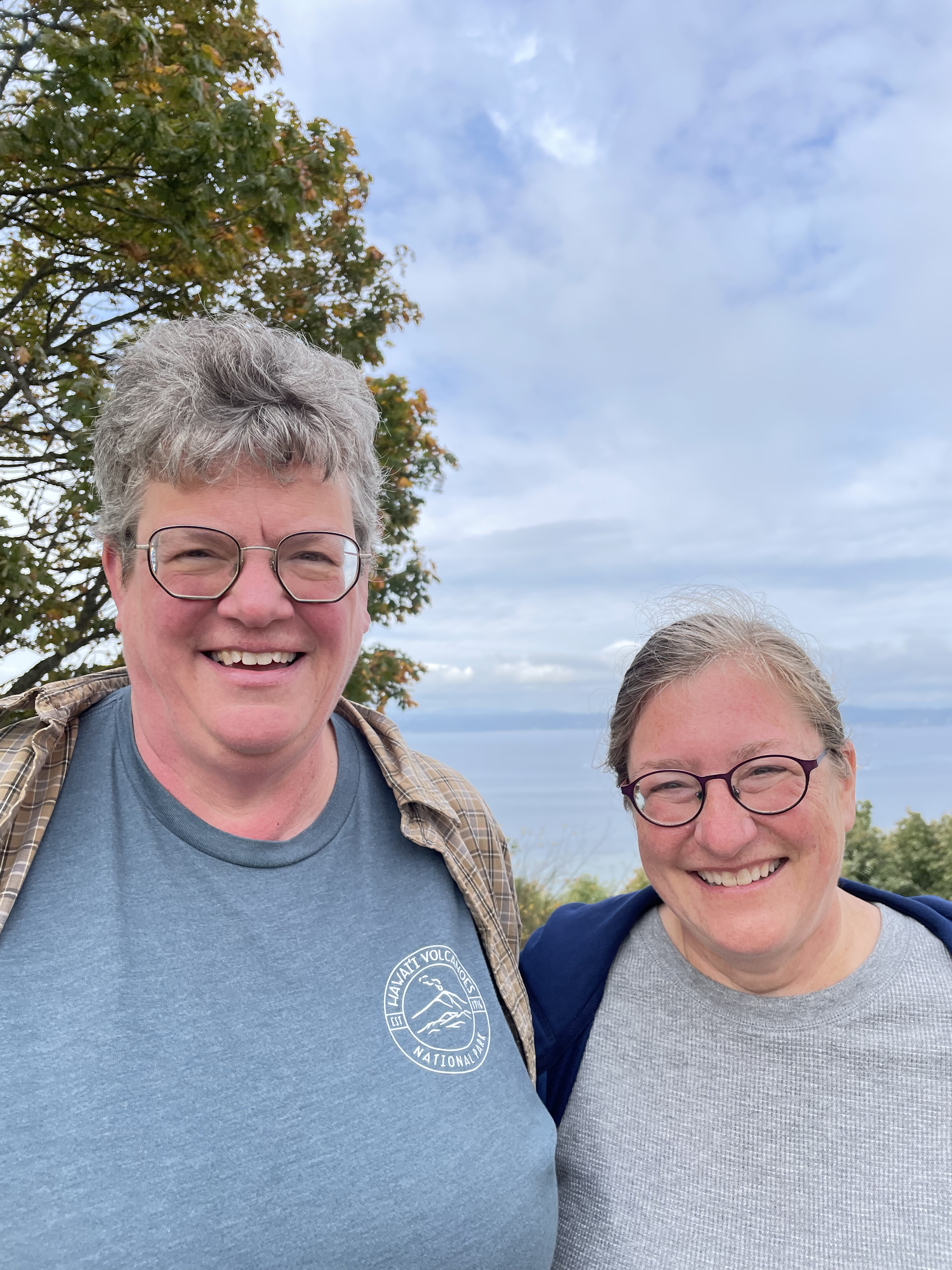
- McCoy (left) and Julie A. Theriot (right) on a hike at Discovery Park (Seattle) in 2025
- Education: Haverford College (BS) University of Wisconsin–Madison (PhD)
- Scientific career
- Fields: Theoretical chemistry
- Institutions: Ohio State University; University of Washington
- Website: sites.uw.edu/mccoygrp/

Anne Bowen McCoy is a theoretical chemist and university professor who researches vibrational spectroscopy, hydrogen bonding, and charge-transfer bands.

== Education ==
McCoy received her BS in chemistry from Haverford College in 1987. She worked with Edwin L. Sibert at University of Wisconsin–Madison and received her PhD in 1992. McCoy was a Golda Meir postdoctoral fellow with R. Benny Gerber at Hebrew University of Jerusalem and University of California, Irvine.

== Career ==
McCoy joined the department of chemistry at Ohio State University as assistant professor in 1994. She received tenure and was promoted to associate professor in 2000, and was promoted to professor in 2004. She moved to the University of Washington in 2015 and is currently the Natt-Lingafelter Professor of Chemistry there.

== Research ==
McCoy's research focuses on developing methods to study fundamental phenomena such as hydrogen bonds and quantum delocalization, using techniques such as solvent-induced electron transfer, and applying theoretical vibrational spectroscopy to understand quantum molecular dynamics.

== Awards and honors ==
- 2023 Jack Simons Award in Theoretical Chemistry, American Chemical Society
- 2012 Fellow of the American Association for the Advancement of Science
- 2011 Crano Lectureship from the Akron section of the American Chemical Society
- 2009 Fellow of the American Chemical Society
- 2007 Fellow of the American Physical Society
- 1998 Bergmann Memorial Award

== Editorial work ==
- Senior Editor, Journal of Physical Chemistry, 2005–2011
- Deputy Editor, Journal of Physical Chemistry A, 2011–
- Co-editor, Annual Review of Physical Chemistry, 2023-

== Selected publications ==
- Huchmala, Rachel M.; McCoy, Anne B. (3 March 2022). "Exploring the Origins of Spectral Signatures of Strong Hydrogen Bonding in Protonated Water Clusters". The Journal of Physical Chemistry A. 126 (8): 1360–1368. Bibcode:2022JPCA..126.1360H. doi:10.1021/acs.jpca.1c10036. ISSN 1089-5639. PMID 35171593.
- Lee, Victor G. M.; McCoy, Anne B. (2019-09-19). "An Efficient Approach for Studies of Water Clusters Using Diffusion Monte Carlo". The Journal of Physical Chemistry A. 123 (37): 8063–8070. Bibcode:2019JPCA..123.8063L. doi:10.1021/acs.jpca.9b06444. ISSN 1089-5639. PMID 31408352. S2CID 199573126.
- Fore, Meredith E.; McCoy, Anne B. (2019-05-30). "Statistical Analysis of the Effect of Deuteration on Quantum Delocalization in CH5+". The Journal of Physical Chemistry A. 123 (21): 4623–4631. Bibcode:2019JPCA..123.4623F. doi:10.1021/acs.jpca.9b02685. ISSN 1089-5639. PMID 31063687. S2CID 147706076.
- Soloveichik, Pesia; O’Donnell, Bridget A.; Lester, Marsha I.; Francisco, Joseph S.; McCoy, Anne B. (2010-01-28). "Infrared Spectrum and Stability of the H2O−HO Complex: Experiment and Theory". The Journal of Physical Chemistry A. 114 (3): 1529–1538. doi:10.1021/jp907885d. ISSN 1089-5639. PMID 19831340.
- Diken, Eric G.; Headrick, Jeffrey M.; Roscioli, Joseph R.; Bopp, Joseph C.; Johnson, Mark A.; McCoy, Anne B. (2005-03-01). "Fundamental Excitations of the Shared Proton in the H3O2- and H5O2+ Complexes". The Journal of Physical Chemistry A. 109 (8): 1487–1490. Bibcode:2005JPCA..109.1487D. doi:10.1021/jp044155v. ISSN 1089-5639. PMID 16833469.
