= Laura Gagliardi =

Italian theoretical and computational chemist

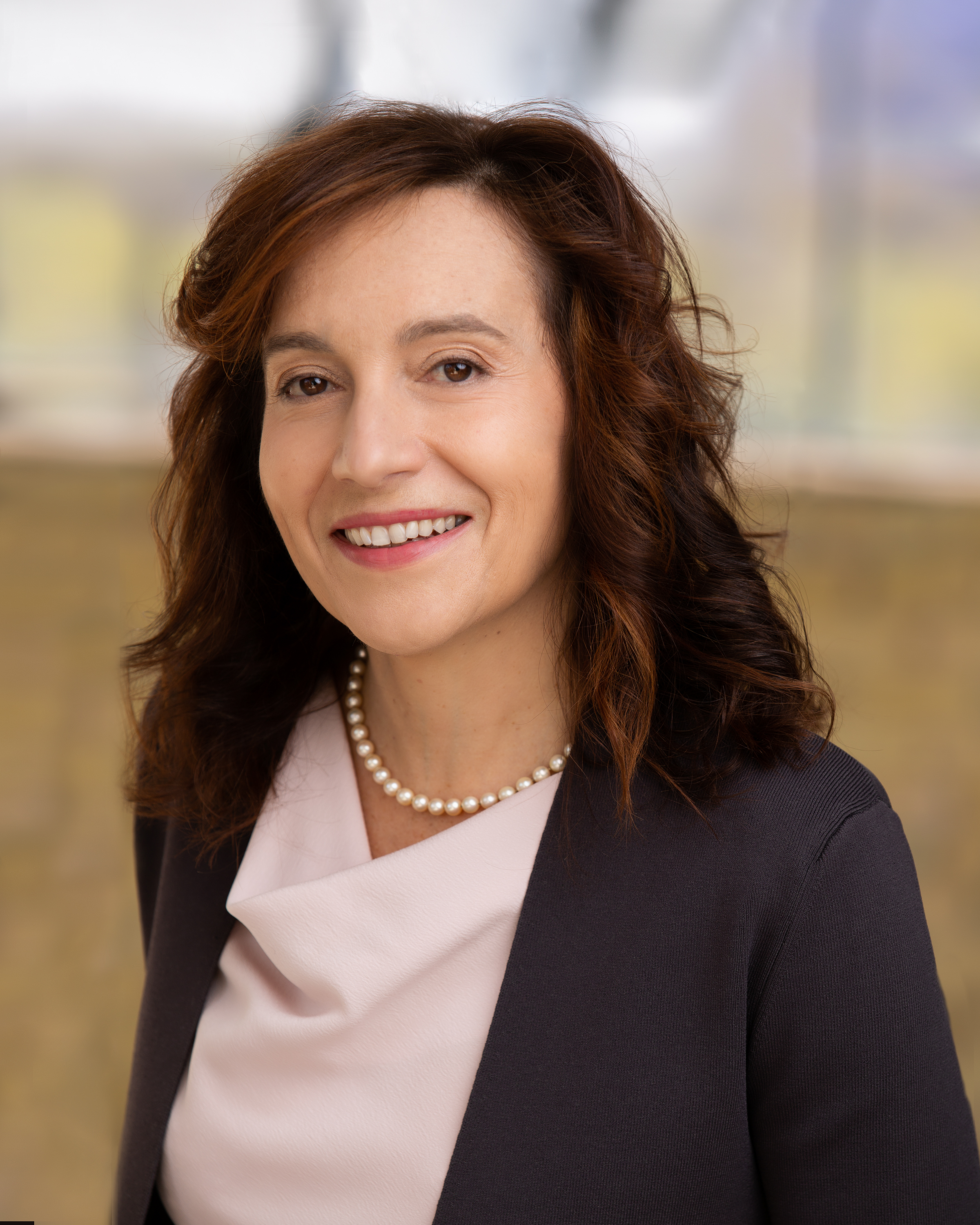
- Born: 6 April 1968 (age 58); Bologna, Italy
- Education: University of Bologna (MSc, PhD)
- Scientific career
- Fields: Theoretical and computational chemistry
- Workplaces: University of Palermo; University of Geneva; University of Minnesota; University of Chicago

Laura Gagliardi (born 6 April 1968) is an Italian theoretical and computational chemist and the Richard and Kathy Leventhal Professor of Chemistry and Molecular Engineering at the University of Chicago. She is known for her work on the development of electronic structure methods and their use for understanding complex chemical systems.

== Education ==
Gagliardi earned her Master of Science degree in chemistry at the University of Bologna in 1992 for which she was awarded 'Toso Montanari' for the student with the highest-mark graduation in chemistry. She earned her PhD at the same university in 1997. She was a postdoctoral research associate at the University of Cambridge from 1998 to 1999.

== Career and research ==
Gagliardi became an assistant professor at the University of Palermo in 2002. In 2005, she became associate professor at the University of Geneva in Switzerland, and in 2009 she joined the University of Minnesota as a professor of chemistry. She was the director of the Nanoporous Materials Genome Center from 2012 to 2014 and of the Inorganometallic Catalyst Design Center from 2014 to 2022. She was also the director of the Chemical Theory Center from 2011 to 2020 at the University of Minnesota. She was appointed as Distinguished McKnight University Professor in 2014 and awarded a McKnight Presidential Endowed Chair in 2018. In 2020, she joined the University of Chicago as the Richard and Kathy Leventhal Professor in chemistry and molecular engineering. Since 2022 she has been serving as Director of the Catalyst Design Center for Decarbonization

She currently serves as Editor-in-Chief for the Journal of Chemical Theory and Computation, and has served as an Associate Editor for the Journal of the American Chemical Society (2021), the Journal of Chemical Theory and Computation (2016-2020), and is a member of the Editorial Advisory Board of the following journals: Journal of Catalysis (2018–present), Chemical Reviews (2015-present), ACS Central Science (2014–present), The Journal of the American Chemical Society (2013-2018), Inorganic Chemistry (2014-2016), Theoretical Chemistry Accounts (2009–present), Journal of Chemical Theory and Computation (2012-2016), and the Journal of Physical Chemistry (2011-2016).

== Honours and awards ==
- 2026: WATOC Schrödinger Medal https://www.watoc.net/watoc.schroedinger.html
- 2025: Solvay Chair in Chemistry http://www.solvayinstitutes.be/html/chair.html
- 2023: Pauling Medal Award https://acspss.org/pauling-medal-award/
- 2022: Elected Member of the Deutsche Akademie der Naturforscher Leopoldina
- 2021: Elected Member of the National Academy of Sciences
- 2021: Elected Foreign Member of the Accademia dei Lincei
- 2021: Faraday Lectureship Prize
- 2020: Peter Debye Award in Physical Chemistry of the American Chemical Society
- 2020: Elected Member of the American Academy of Arts and Sciences
- 2019: Award in Theoretical Chemistry from the Physical Chemistry Division of the American Chemical Society
- 2019: Elected Member of the International Academy of Quantum Molecular Science
- 2018: Humboldt Research Award
- 2018: Elected Member of the Academia Europaea
- 2017: Elected Member of the World Association of Theoretical and Computational Chemists
- 2016: Elected Fellow of the Royal Society of Chemistry
- 2016: Bourke Award of the Royal Society of Chemistry
- 2016: Isaiah Shavitt Lectureship Award, Technion
- 2016: Elected Fellow of the American Physical Society
- 2004: Annual Award of the International Academy of Quantum Molecular Sciences

== Personal life ==
Gagliardi is married to Christopher J. Cramer; the couple has three children from a prior marriage.
