= Annual Review of Physical Chemistry =

- Discipline: Physical chemistry
- Language: English
- Edited by: Theodore Goodson III, Anne McCoy

Publication details
- History: 1950–present
- Publisher: Annual Reviews (United States)
- Frequency: Annually
- Open access: Subscribe to Open
- Impact factor: 9.5 (2025)

Standard abbreviations
- ISO 4: Annu. Rev. Phys. Chem.

Indexing
- CODEN: ARPLAP
- ISSN: 0066-426X (print); 1545-1593 (web)
- LCCN: a51001658
- OCLC no.: 1373069

Links
- Journal homepage

Annual Review of Physical Chemistry is a peer-reviewed scientific journal published by Annual Reviews (AR). It covers all topics pertaining to physical chemistry. The editors are Theodore Goodson III and Anne McCoy. As of 2023, Annual Review of Physical Chemistry is being published as open access, under the Subscribe to Open model. The journal is indexed in the Science Citation Index Expanded and Chemical Abstracts Service. As of 2026, Journal Citation Reports gives it a 2025 impact factor of 9.5.

== History ==
The Annual Review of Physical Chemistry was first published in 1950 by Annual Reviews (AR), a nonprofit organization whose stated mission is to synthesize knowledge "for the progress of science and the benefit of society." Its founding editor was University of California chemist Gerhard Krohn Rollefson. Some branches of physical chemistry were designated to be reviewed with each volume, while other branches would be reviewed less frequently. Upon Rollefson's death in 1955, he was succeeded by Henry Eyring. The editorial committee considered changing the name of the journal in the 1980s to the Annual Review of Physical Chemistry and Chemical Physics, but decided against it by 1988. In addition to publishing reviews about physical chemistry, many volumes contain a prefatory chapter with an informal review of a chemist or institution. As of 2020, it was published both in print and electronically.

It defines its scope as covering recent developments in the fields of biophysical chemistry, chemical kinetics, colloids, electrochemistry, geochemistry, cosmochemistry, atmospheric chemistry, laser chemistry and ultrafast processes, the liquid state, magnetic resonance, physical organic chemistry, polymers, and macromolecules. As of 2026, Journal Citation Reports gives it a 2025 impact factor of 9.5, ranking it thirty-seventh of 191 journal titles in the category "Chemistry, Physical".

== Editorial processes ==
The Annual Review of Physical Chemistry is helmed by the editor or co-editors. The editor is assisted by the editorial committee, which includes associate editors, regular members, and occasionally guest editors. Guest members participate at the invitation of the editor and serve terms of one year. All other members of the editorial committee are appointed by the AR board of directors and serve five-year terms. The editorial committee determines which topics should be included in each volume and solicits reviews from qualified authors. Unsolicited manuscripts are not accepted. Peer review of accepted manuscripts is undertaken by the editorial committee.

=== Editors of volumes ===
Dates indicate publication years in which someone was credited as a lead editor or co-editor of a journal volume. The planning process for a volume begins well before the volume appears, so appointment to the position of lead editor generally occurred prior to the first year shown here. An editor who has retired or died may be credited as a lead editor of a volume that they helped to plan, even if it is published after their retirement or death.

- Gerhard Krohn Rollefson (1950–1955)
- Henry Eyring (1956–1976)
- Benton Seymour Rabinovitch (1977–1985)
- Herbert L. Strauss (1986–2001)
- Stephen Leone (2002–2011; retired 2011; credited 2012–2013)
- Mark A. Johnson (appointed 2012; credited 2014–2023)) and Todd Martínez (co-editors) (appointed 2012; credited 2014–2025)
- Todd J. Martínez (credited to 2025) and Anne McCoy (appointed 2023)
- Anne McCoy and Theodore Goodson III (2025–present).

== See also ==
- List of chemistry journals
