= Brian Orr =

Australian physicist

Brian J. Orr is an Australian scientist known for various experimental and theoretical contributions to molecular and optical physics, including laser spectroscopy and optical parametric oscillators.

== Biography ==
Born in 1942, Orr grew up in Sydney and graduated with BSc (Hons I) and MSc from the University of Sydney. He received his PhD from the University of Bristol (UK) in 1968 and, after a postdoctoral period in Ottawa (Canada), returned to Sydney in 1969 to take up an academic position at the University of New South Wales. In 1988, he became Professor of Chemistry in the Faculty of Science at Macquarie University. Since 2003, Orr has been an Emeritus Professor, based in Macquarie University’s Department of Physics and Astronomy. His roles at Macquarie University have included service as Head of School/Department (1989–92/1999–2002), as Deputy Chair of the Academic Senate (1989–92), and as a member of the University Council (1999–2002). He is Founding Director (2007–2010) of MQ Photonics – a University Research Centre incorporating the former Special Research Centre for Lasers and Applications, of which he was Deputy Director (1988–2002) and then Director (2003–07). Orr has been an editor for the international journals Optics Express, JOSAB and Chemical Physics Letters.

Many of the accomplishments of Brian Orr and his research students and colleagues have been summarized in the Optical Society's citation for his 2004 W. F. Meggers Award: "for advancing molecular spectroscopy by experiment and theory on infrared- and Raman-ultraviolet double resonance, coherent Raman spectroscopy, cavity ringdown spectroscopy, photoelectron spectroscopy, nonlinear optics, and tunable coherent light sources."

== Recognition ==
- 1995: Fellow of the Optical Society
- 1987: Fellow of the Australian Institute of Physics
- 1978: Fellow of the Royal Australian Chemical Institute
- 1994: Inaugural Physical Chemistry Division Medal from the Royal Australian Chemical Institute
- 2004: William F. Meggers Award in Spectroscopy from the Optical Society
- 2005: W. H. (Beattie) Steel Medal from the Australian Optical Society
- 2023: Lifetime Fellow of the Australian Institute of Physics
