= Polanyi Medal =

Gas kinetics award of the Royal Society of Chemistry

The Polanyi Medal is a biennial award of the Royal Society of Chemistry for outstanding contributions to the field of gas kinetics. The medal is presented at the International Symposium on Gas Kinetics after a plenary lecture given by the prize winner.

The award is named after the Hungarian-British polymath Michael Polanyi, 1891-1976, whose research helped to establish the topic of gas kinetics and reaction dynamics. His son, John Polanyi, received the Polanyi Medal in 1988.

== Winners ==
2024	Timothy J. Wallington
2022	Frédérique Battin-Leclerc
2020	Stephen Klippenstein
2018	Barbara J. Finlayson-Pitts
2016	James Anderson
2014	Craig Taatjes
2012	Mario Molina
2010	Stephen Leone
2008	Piero Casavecchia
2006	Horst Hippler
2004	David Clary
2002	Gus Hancock
2000	Jürgen Wolfrum
1998	Akkihebbal Ravishankara
1996	John Simons
1994	Mike Pilling
1992	Jurgen Tröe [sic]
1990	Ian William Murison Smith
1988	John Polanyi
1987	Fred Kaufmann [sic] (awarded posthumously)
1986	Sidney W. Benson
1984	Benton Seymour Rabinovitch
1982	Brian Thrush
1981	Dudley Herschbach
1979	Richard Zare

== See also ==
- List of chemistry awards
