= Chris Kramer (disambiguation) =

Chris Kramer (born 1988) is an American basketball player.

Chris Kramer may also refer to:

- Chris Kramer (actor) (born 1975), Canadian actor

== See also ==
- Christina Kramer, language professor
- Chris Cramer (disambiguation)
