= Robert P. Madden =

American physicist

- Born: 1928; New York
- Died: 1 April 2014 (aged 85–86)
- Education: University of Rochester; Johns Hopkins University
- Awards: William F. Meggers Award in Spectroscopy
- Scientific career
- Fields: physics; spectroscopy
- Workplaces: National Bureau of Standards; NIST

Robert P. Madden (1928 – 1 April 2014) was an American spectroscopist who was president of the Optical Society of America in 1982.

He studied as an undergraduate at University of Rochester and as a postgraduate at Johns Hopkins University. After gaining his Ph.D. in 1956 (on diffraction gratings) he worked from 1958 to 1961 as a physicist with the U.S. Army Engineering Research and Development Laboratories (AERDL) at Fort Belvoir, Virginia on the optical properties of thin films in the ultraviolet. He then joined the National Bureau of Standards as head of the newly created Far Ultraviolet Physics Section, where he used the bureau's electron synchrotron to measure the effect of ultraviolet radiation on helium. Before his retirement in 1998 the synchrotron had been substantially upgraded and used on a wide variety of investigations.

Madden was inducted as a Fellow of the Optical Society in 1964, received their William F. Meggers Award in Spectroscopy in 1978, and served as president of the society in 1982. He was also elected a Fellow of the American Physical Society in 1967 and inducted into the National Institute of Standards and Technology Gallery of Distinguished Scientists, Engineers and Administrators in 2000.

== See also ==
- Optical Society of America#Past Presidents of the OSA
