= Louis F. DiMauro =

American experimental physicist

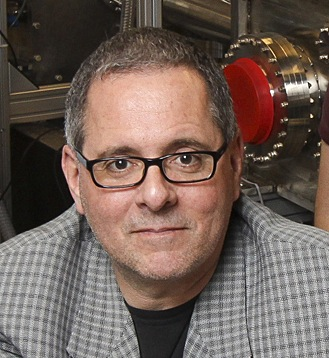
- Alma mater: Hunter College; University of Connecticut
- Awards: Fellow of the American Physical Society; Arthur L. Schawlow Prize in Laser Science (2017); Fellow of the American Association for the Advancement of Science; Optica Fellow (2002); William F. Meggers Award in Spectroscopy (2013)
- Academic career
- Institutions: Brookhaven National Laboratory (1988–2004); Lawrence Livermore National Laboratory (1994–); Stony Brook University; Ohio State University (2004–)

Louis Franklin DiMauro (born April 9, 1953, Brooklyn, New York) is an American atomic physicist, the Edward and Sylvia Hagenlocker Professor In the department of physics at the Ohio State University, Columbus, Ohio, USA. His interests are atomic, molecular and optical physics. He has been elected a Fellow of the American Association for the Advancement of Science, American Physical Society and Optical Society.

== Career ==
DiMauro received his BS from Hunter College, City University of New York and his Ph.D. from University of Connecticut in 1980 and was a postdoctoral fellow at Stony Brook University before arriving at AT&T Bell Laboratories as a member of the technical staff in 1981. He joined the staff at Brookhaven National Laboratory in 1988 rising to the rank of senior scientist. Concurrently, he was appointed visiting professor of physics at Stony Brook University. In 2004 he accepted the position of professor and the Edward and Sylvia Hagenlocker Chair of Physics at The Ohio State University (OSU). He runs a lab at OSU jointly with Pierre Agostini.

His research interest is in experimental ultra-fast and strong-field physics. In 1993, he and his collaborators introduced the widely accepted semi-classical rescattering or three-step model in strong-field physics.

== Honors and awards ==
His research accomplishments have been recognized by:

- 2004 DOE BNL/BSA Science & Technology Prize
- 2012 OSU Distinguished Scholar Award
- 2013 OSA William F. Meggers Award in Spectroscopy
- 2017 APS Arthur Schawlow Prize.

== Selected publications ==
- Blaga, Cosmin I.; Xu, Junliang; DiChiara, Anthony D.; Sistrunk, Emily; Zhang, Kaikai; et al. (2012). "Imaging ultrafast molecular dynamics with laser-induced electron diffraction". Nature. 483 (7388). Springer Science and Business Media LLC: 194–197. Bibcode:2012Natur.483..194B. doi:10.1038/nature10820. ISSN 0028-0836. PMID 22398558. S2CID 4426271.
- DiChiara, A. D.; Sistrunk, E.; Blaga, C. I.; Szafruga, U. B.; Agostini, P.; DiMauro, L. F. (18 January 2012). "Inelastic Scattering of Broadband Electron Wave Packets Driven by an Intense Midinfrared Laser Field". Physical Review Letters. 108 (3) 033002. American Physical Society (APS). arXiv:1109.0301. Bibcode:2012PhRvL.108c3002D. doi:10.1103/physrevlett.108.033002. ISSN 0031-9007. PMID 22400735. S2CID 30291364.
- Doumy, G.; Wheeler, J.; Roedig, C.; Chirla, R.; Agostini, P.; DiMauro, L. F. (6 March 2009). "Attosecond Synchronization of High-Order Harmonics from Midinfrared Drivers". Physical Review Letters. 102 (9) 093002. American Physical Society (APS). Bibcode:2009PhRvL.102i3002D. doi:10.1103/physrevlett.102.093002. hdl:1811/48157. ISSN 0031-9007. PMID 19392517.
- Agostini, Pierre; DiMauro, Louis F (15 May 2004). "The physics of attosecond light pulses". Reports on Progress in Physics. 67 (6). IOP Publishing: 813–855. Bibcode:2004RPPh...67..813A. doi:10.1088/0034-4885/67/6/r01. ISSN 0034-4885. S2CID 250879086.
- Tate, J.; Auguste, T.; Muller, H. G.; Salières, P.; Agostini, P.; DiMauro, L. F. (4 January 2007). "Scaling of Wave-Packet Dynamics in an Intense Midinfrared Field". Physical Review Letters. 98 (1) 013901. American Physical Society (APS). Bibcode:2007PhRvL..98a3901T. doi:10.1103/physrevlett.98.013901. hdl:1811/48056. ISSN 0031-9007. PMID 17358475.
- Schafer, K. J.; Yang, Baorui; DiMauro, L. F.; Kulander, K. C. (15 March 1993). "Above threshold ionization beyond the high harmonic cutoff". Physical Review Letters. 70 (11). American Physical Society (APS): 1599–1602. Bibcode:1993PhRvL..70.1599S. doi:10.1103/physrevlett.70.1599. ISSN 0031-9007. PMID 10053336. S2CID 31450243.
