= Clyde A. Hutchison Jr. =

American chemist

Clyde Allen Hutchison Jr. (May 5, 1913 – August 29, 2005) was an American chemist notable for his research in magnetic resonance spectroscopy. Hutchison was a member of the National Academy of Sciences and a chairman and professor of the department of chemistry at the University of Chicago. He was also a fellow of the American Academy of Arts and Sciences, a fellow of the American Physical Society, a member of the American Chemical Society, Guggenheim fellow at Oxford University, the George Eastman Professor at Oxford University, and a member of the American Association for the Advancement of Science. He was also a recipient of the Peter Debye Award in Physical Chemistry from the American Chemical Society. He served as editor of the Journal of Chemical Physics from 1953 to 1955 and again from 1958 to 1959. Hutchison participated in the Manhattan Project. The University of Chicago said that Hutchison "pioneered research in magnetic resonance spectroscopy".

== Chronology ==
- 1913: born May 5 in Alliance, Ohio.
- 1933: a bachelor's degree from Cedarville College
- 1937: Ph.D. from Ohio State University
- 1937–1939: a National Research Council Fellow and worked with Nobel laureate Harold Urey at Columbia University
- 1939: an assistant professor of chemistry at the University of Buffalo
- 1940–1945: member of the Manhattan Project at Columbia University and the University of Virginia
- 1945–1983: member of the faculty of the University of Chicago's Department of Chemistry
  - chairman of the department of chemistry 1959-1963
  - elected to the National Academy of Sciences in 1963
- 1983: retirement
- 2005: died of prostate cancer on Aug. 29 at Montgomery Place Retirement Community in Chicago at age 92
