= Society of Intensive Care Medicine =

Coordinates: 1.2910°N 103.8061°E

The Society of Intensive Care Medicine (SICM) is the representative body for Intensive Care Medicine (ICM) professionals in Singapore.

== History ==
Before 1970, Intensive care units (ICUs) did not exist in Singapore. In the 1970s, parts of public hospital wards were crudely designated as ICUs. During the 1980s, dedicated physical spaces, with the necessary equipment and trained nursing staff, were developed to treat critically ill patients.

Singapore was a founding member of the Western Pacific Association of Critical Care Medicine (WPACCM) – now known as the Asia Pacific Association of Critical Care Medicine (APACCM) – and hosted the Inaugural Congress of the Association in 1981 and the 11th edition in 2000. SICM was officially formed in 1995, with the late Dr Ng Kim Swee as her founding President. The elected President and the Executive Committee are unpaid volunteers and each term is for 2 years.

== Education ==
SICM submitted a position paper on "A formalized accreditation and training system for adult intensive care medicine" to the Ministry of Health, Singapore in 2002. This led to the formation of the Sub-specialty Training Committee in ICM in 2007 and ICM was recognised as a sub-specialty with the Specialists Accreditation Board in 2012.

=== SICM SymPOsium ===
The inaugural biennial SICM Symposium (SISPO) was held on 23 April 2016 for adult and paediatric intensivists and ICM trainees. It comprised "Year-In-Review" lectures on ICM key topics such as haemodynamics, ventilation, nutrition, nephrology, and neurocritical care, as well as several workshops.

=== SG-ANZICS Intensive Care Forum ===
SICM partnered with the Australian and New Zealand Intensive Care Society (ANZICS) to organise the biennial SG-ANZICS Intensive Care Forum in 2011.

== Research ==
SICM set up its multicentre research arm known as the National Investigators for Clinical Epidemiology and Research (SICM-NICER) in 2008. It collaborates with the Asian Critical Care Clinical Trials Group and published several papers on ICM from an Asian perspective.

SICM collaborated with the Ministry of Health, Singapore to set up the Singapore National ICU Repository (NICUR) to advance future research.
