= George W. Flynn =

American chemist and educator

George William Flynn
- Born: 1938; Hartford, Connecticut
- Died: January 8, 2020 (aged 81–82); Charlotte, North Carolina
- Education: Yale University (B.Sc.); Harvard University (Ph.D.)
- Awards: Herbert P. Broida Prize in Chemical Physics (2003)
- Scientific career
- Fields: scanning tunneling microscopy laser spectroscopy
- Workplaces: Massachusetts Institute of Technology; Columbia University
- Doctoral advisor: E. Bright Wilson; John Baldeschwieler

George W. Flynn (1938-January 8, 2020) was an American physical chemist and professor at Columbia University, known for his work in laser spectroscopy and scanning tunneling microscopy.

== Early life and career ==
In 1938, Flynn was born and raised in Hartford, CT. Following the death of his father while he was still in high school, he was admitted to Yale University on a full scholarship. As an undergraduate he worked on research in the laboratory of Julian Sturtevant in the chemistry department at Yale. He received his bachelor's degree in 1960 and went to Harvard University to pursue a doctorate in chemistry. His thesis was supervised jointly by E. Bright Wilson Jr. (in molecular spectroscopy) and John Baldeschwieler (in nuclear magnetic resonance spectroscopy). Follow the completion of his doctorate in 1964, he worked as a postdoctoral researcher at MIT in the physics department under Ali Javan. Together they developed, studied, and patented a new type of carbon dioxide gas laser. From there he joined the chemistry department at Columbia University in 1967 as an assistant professor, where he rose to the rank of professor of chemistry and chemical engineering, and was appointed as the Thomas Alva Edison Professor in 1986.

== Important contributions ==
At Columbia, Flynn and his group developed new laser spectroscopy experiments to study the redistribution of quantum vibration energy within single molecules and the transfer of energy between colliding molecules. In a collaboration with Norman Sutin at Brookhaven National Laboratories, Flynn and Sutin developed laser-based methods for measuring the rates of reaction in solution. He also used scanning tunneling microscopy to study self-assembly of molecules at surfaces and other interfaces.

== Awards and honors ==
Flynn was elected a fellow of the American Academy of Arts and Sciences (1997) and the National Academy of Sciences (2001).He received the Herbert P. Broida Prize in Chemical Physics (2003) of the American Physical Society, as well as the E. Bright Wilson Award in Spectroscopy and the Irving Langmuir Prize in Chemical Physics of the American Chemical Society.

== Personal life ==
George Flynn married Jean Pieri, who holds a doctorate in nursing education, in 1970; they had two children together.
