= Allen Shenstone =

Canadian physicist (1893–1980)

Allen Goodrich Shenstone
- Born: July 27, 1893; Toronto, Ontario, Canada
- Died: February 16, 1980 (aged 86); Princeton, New Jersey, U.S.
- Education: Princeton University; University of Cambridge
- Awards: Military Cross
- Scientific career
- Fields: Physics
- Workplaces: University of Toronto; Princeton University
- Academic advisors: J. J. Thomson; C. T. R. Wilson; Ernest Rutherford

Allen Goodrich Shenstone, OBE, MC (July 27, 1893 – February 16, 1980) was a Canadian physicist. He earned bachelor's, master's, and Ph.D. degrees from Princeton University, as well as a Bachelor of Arts from the University of Cambridge. After a brief stint as a junior faculty member at the University of Toronto, he returned to Princeton, where he was a professor in the Department of Physics 1925–62. He chaired the department 1949–60. He worked primarily in the field of atomic spectroscopy. He was awarded the Military Cross for his service in the Royal Engineers in World War I and made an Officer of the Order of the British Empire for his work as a scientific officer in World War II.

== Family ==
Shenstone was born in Toronto July 27, 1893, the last of six children of Eliza Hara and Joseph Newton Shenstone. Joseph Shenstone was a senior executive of the Massey-Harris Company, a large manufacturer of agricultural equipment that later became Massey Ferguson. All six siblings attended university, which was unusual at the time.

Shenstone married Molly Chadwick in 1923. They had three children, but only one survived to adulthood. This child, the Canadian diplomat Michael Shenstone, produced three grandchildren. Molly died in 1967, and Allen was remarried two years later to Tiffin Harper.

== Education and World War I ==
Shenstone attended Huron Street Public School and Harbord Collegiate Institute in Toronto. In 1910 he enrolled at Princeton University in the United States, where he was the only Canadian of the 400 entering students. As an undergraduate he was a member of Cap and Gown Club and a close friend of Allen Dulles. He played on the ice hockey team with Hobey Baker. He graduated magna cum laude in 1914 and then spent two terms at the Cavendish Laboratory of the University of Cambridge working on experiments under J. J. Thomson and C. T. R. Wilson.

Shenstone left Cambridge in 1915 to serve in the Royal Engineers in World War I. He was commissioned in March 1915 and within months was commanding a company of 400 men building trenches. He saw action at Passchendaele and the Hindenburg Line, was promoted to captain in September 1917, and received the Military Cross. He served briefly with the British Army of the Rhine and returned to Canada in August 1919.

In fall 1919, he returned to Princeton, where he and Henry DeWolf Smyth were the only graduate students in physics. Shenstone struggled initially with returning to research after five years at war but was nonetheless awarded a prestigious fellowship. Princeton awarded him a Master of Arts degree in 1920. From January to August 1921, he was back at the Cavendish Laboratory. This time he worked under Ernest Rutherford on experiments related to radioactivity and earned a second Bachelor of Arts from Cambridge. He completed his Ph.D. at Princeton the following year, writing his dissertation on an experiment that attempted to show a connection between the Hall effect and photoemission.

== Academic career ==
Shenstone became a junior faculty member at the University of Toronto in 1922. Here he developed an interest in atomic spectroscopy and performed his first experiments in the field. In 1925 he became an assistant professor at Princeton, where he spent the rest of his academic career. At Princeton he secured new research equipment and performed important experiments, establishing himself as a leader in optical spectroscopy. His work on the spectrum of copper was particularly noteworthy. He was named the Class of 1909 Professor of Physics in 1938.

Shenstone returned to military service in World War II, again using his scientific background. In November 1940 he moved to Ottawa, where he served as Special Assistant to the President of the Canadian National Research Council. In this role he was a scientific liaison between Canada and the (still officially neutral) United States. In April 1942 he moved to London, where he remained until the conclusion of the war working with other scientists on war-related projects. He was named an Officer of the Order of the British Empire in June 1943.

Returning to Princeton in 1945, Shenstone resumed his duties at the Department of Physics. He continued his research in spectroscopy, publishing on doubly ionized species. In 1946 he became a founding member of the National Research Council's committee on line spectra of the elements; he chaired the committee 1961–65. In 1949 he succeeded Smyth as chairman of the physics department, a position he held until 1960. In 1931 he was elected a Fellow of the American Physical Society. In 1950 he was elected a Fellow of the Royal Society. He retired from Princeton in 1962 but remained active, continuing his experiments until 1976 and publishing as late as 1977. In 1971 the Optical Society awarded him the William F. Meggers Award for his work in spectroscopy. He died February 16, 1980, in Princeton.
