= Stephen Leone =

American physical chemist

- Education: Northwestern University B.A. (1970); University of California, Berkeley Ph.D. (1974)
- Known for: Attosecond spectroscopy, Transient absorption spectroscopy
- Scientific career
- Fields: Physical chemistry
- Workplaces: University of California, Berkeley
- Doctoral advisor: C. Bradley Moore
- Website: www.cchem.berkeley.edu/leonegrp/

Stephen Robert Leone (born May 19, 1948) is an American physical chemist and the John R. Thomas Endowed Chair in Physical Chemistry at the University of California, Berkeley.

== Early life and education ==
Leone was born in Queens, New York City, on May 19, 1948, of Italian descent. The family moved to Rochester, New Hampshire, and later Batavia, Illinois, where Stephen attended primary and secondary school. Leone earned a bachelor's degree from Northwestern University and spent a summer working at Lawrence Livermore National Laboratory prior to attending the University of California, Berkeley for graduate study. In 1974, Leone began teaching at the University of Southern California, and later moved to JILA, a research institute at the University of Colorado Boulder. Leone returned to Berkeley in 2002. He was editor of the Annual Review of Physical Chemistry from 2002–2011, retiring as editor in 2011; and is credited for organizing the volumes for 2012–2013.

== Awards and honors ==
Over the course of his career, Leone has received the ACS Award in Pure Chemistry (1982) and Peter Debye Award (2005) from the American Chemical Society, the Bourke Award (1995) and Polanyi Medal (2010) from the Royal Society of Chemistry and the Herbert P. Broida Prize (1989) of the American Physical Society, among several others. He has been awarded Sloan and Guggenheim fellowships, and was elected a member of the United States National Academy of Sciences in 1995.
