= Christopher J. Cramer =

American university vice president and research scientist, born 1961

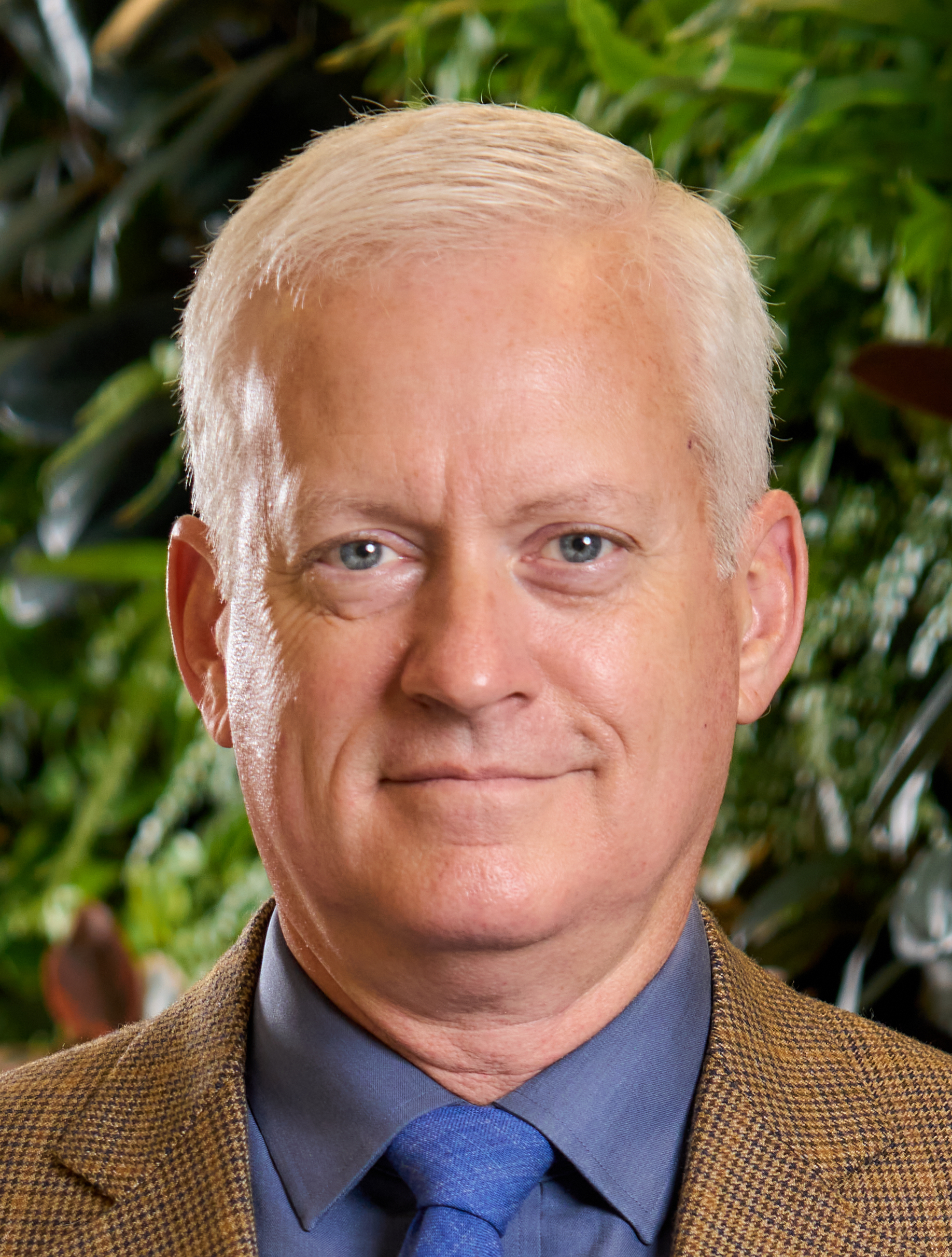
- Born: September 23, 1961 (age 64)
- Citizenship: United States of America; Italy
- Education: University of Illinois at Urbana–Champaign (Ph.D.); Washington University in St. Louis (undergraduate)
- Occupations: Vice President for Research, University of Minnesota (2018–2021); Chief Research Officer, Underwriters Laboratories Inc. (2021–present)
- Years active: 1992–present
- Notable work: Essentials of Computational Chemistry: Theories and Models (2013)
- Spouses: Katherine Dowd, Laura Gagliardi
- Children: 3
- Scientific career
- Awards: Arthur S Flemming Award, Fellow of the American Chemical Society, Fellow of the John Simon Guggenheim Memorial Foundation, Fellow of the Alfred P. Sloan Foundation
- Fields: Theoretical chemistry, computational chemistry, organic chemistry, chemical physics, quantum chemistry
- Workplaces: University of Minnesota; Underwriters Laboratories Inc.
- Doctoral advisor: Scott E. Denmark
- Military career
- Branch: U.S. Army
- Service years: 1988–1992
- Served in: Gulf War

Christopher J. Cramer (born September 23, 1961) is a research chemist and served as vice president for research at the University of Minnesota from 2018–2021. He presently serves as executive vice president and chief research officer for Underwriters Laboratories Inc.

== Education ==
Cramer studied mathematics and chemistry at Washington University in St. Louis, Missouri. He earned a Ph.D. in chemistry from the University of Illinois at Urbana–Champaign, working with doctoral advisor Scott E. Denmark.

== Military service ==
Cramer served for four years as an officer in the U.S. Army Chemical Corps from 1988 to 1992, including combat duty in Iraq during Operation Desert Storm.

== Scientific career ==
In 1992, Cramer joined the faculty in the University of Minnesota's department of chemistry, where he remained for his entire academic career. In addition to teaching and research, Cramer was director of both undergraduate and graduate studies in the chemistry department for three years each. He led the university's Faculty Consultative Committee in 2011–2012. From 2013 to 2018, he was associate dean for academic affairs in the U of M's College of Sciences and Engineering. He moved into the position of associate dean for research and planning in 2018, then became vice president for research later that year on the retirement of predecessor Allen Levine. Cramer oversaw one of the largest public-research programs in the United States, managing the administration, planning, and regulation of nearly $1 billion in research projects across the entire University of Minnesota system, including economic and technical development, and interdisciplinary efforts involving transportation and the environment. In 2021, he left the University of Minnesota and became the senior vice president and chief research officer for Underwriters Laboratories Inc. He made this career move shortly after his wife, Laura Gagliardi, left the University of Minnesota for a faculty position at the University of Chicago.

Cramer was editor-in-chief (and before that, associate editor) of the scientific journal Theoretical Chemistry Accounts from 1997 to 2014. He was associate editor for the Journal of Physical Organic Chemistry from 1997 to 2018.

He is the author of the 2013 textbook Essentials of Computational Chemistry: Theories and Models. Cramer also helped pioneer the university's e-learning programs by developing the online course Statistical Molecular Thermodynamics.

His research work has covered a wide area, including advancements in solar energy (as head of the Center for the Study of Charge Transfer and Charge Transport in Photoactivated Systems), and computer simulations of chemical weapons to assist in identification and cleanup. He has also worked extensively with the Minnesota Supercomputing Institute.

Cramer has received several awards for teaching and public service. He was named a Distinguished McKnight University Professor, received the George W. Taylor Award of Distinguished Service in 2013, and the Horace T. Morse-University of Minnesota Alumni Association Award for Outstanding Contributions to Undergraduate Education in 2011.

He has also worked to increase public awareness and appreciation of science, and has been quoted in news articles and television reports as an expert on popular chemistry-related topics such as tear gas and pepper spray, slime, road salt, and the persistence of particular smells.

== Publications ==
Even after moving into administrative roles, Cramer continued to be active in scientific research. Cramer has written or co-written more than 500 articles for scientific journals and other scholarly publications. He has also written or edited several books, as follows:

=== As author ===
- Essentials of Computational Chemistry: Theories and Models (2013)
- Statistical Molecular Thermodynamics (Coursera Massive Open Online Course)

=== As editor ===
- Structure and Reactivity in Aqueous Solution: Characterization of Chemical and Biological Systems (American Chemical Society Symposium Series, 1994)
- Theoretical Chemistry Accounts: New Century Issue (2000; a special reprint of Vol. 103, issues 3-4 of the journal)
- Perspectives on Theoretical Chemistry: Five Decades of Theoretical Chemistry Accounts and Theoretica Chimica Acta

== Awards and fellowships ==
- In 2010, he was named a Fellow of the American Chemical Society. In August 2020, he received the society's Arthur C. Cope Scholar award for 2021.
- In 2000, he was named a Fellow of the John Simon Guggenheim Memorial Foundation.
- In 1996, he was named a Fellow of the Alfred P. Sloan Foundation.
- In 1991, he received the Arthur S Flemming Award.

== Personal life ==
Cramer is married to University of Chicago chemistry professor Laura Gagliardi; the couple has three children from a prior marriage.
