= Ultrafast molecular process =

Technology renting on short-lived molecule properties

An ultrafast molecular process is any technology that relies on properties of molecules that are only extant for a very short period of time (less than a nanosecond). Such processes are very important in areas such as combustion chemistry and in the study of proteins.
