= Curt Wittig =

- Scientific career
- Fields: Chemistry
- Institutions: USC

Curt Franklin Wittig is a professor of chemistry and the holder of the Paul A. Miller Chair in the college of letters, arts, and sciences at the University of Southern California (USC).

Born and raised in Chicago, Illinois, Wittig received his B.S. and Ph.D. in electrical engineering from the University of Illinois in 1970.

Postdoctoral work (EE at USC, chemistry at Cambridge (UK) and UC Berkeley) was followed by a faculty appointment in 1973 at USC in the EE Department. After becoming a professor in 1979, his interests changed, and he moved to the chemistry and physics departments in 1981, settling eventually in the chemistry department, where he has specialized in physical chemistry (chemical physics) ever since.

Wittig and his wife, Michele, live in Santa Monica, California.

== Research focus ==
His earliest contributions were technological: invention of the continuous carbon monoxide chemical laser in 1969, and development and demonstration of the so-called infrared process of laser isotope separation in the late 1970s. Interests then evolved to more fundamental studies. In the 1980s and 1990s his main contributions were in the areas of unimolecular reactions of polyatomic molecules, and photoinitiated reactions in weakly bound complexes. The latter was acknowledged in 1993 with the Herbert P. Broida Prize in Atomic, Molecular, and Chemical Physics (given by the American Physical Society); together they were acknowledged through the Bourke Lectures and Medal in 2000 (given by the Royal Society of Chemistry, UK).

Recent research (including ongoing) addresses issues in amorphous solid water, photophysics in doped superfluid helium nanodroplets, complex photochemistry and photophysics of polyatomic molecules, and theories of particle statistics and geometric phases.

== Publications ==
=== Book chapters ===
1. Gas trapping in ice and its release upon warming; A. Bar-Nun, D. Laufer, O. Rebolledo-Mayoral, S. Malyk, H. Reisler, C. Wittig; Solar System Ices, M. Gudipati, editor (World Scientific, Singapore, 2010).
2. Fundamental Aspects of Molecular Photochemistry; C. Wittig; Encyclopedia of Physical Science and Technology, Third Edition, (Academic Press, 2001).
3. Dynamics of ground state bimolecular reactions; C. Wittig and A.H. Zewail; Atomic and Molecular Clusters, E. Bernstein, editor (Oxford Press, 1996).
4. Regioselective photochemistry in weakly bonded complexes; S.K. Shin, Y. Chen, E. Böhmer and C. Wittig; The Dye Laser: 20 Years (Springer-Verlag, 1992) 57-76.
5. State resolved simple bond fission reactions: experiment and theory; H. Reisler and C. Wittig; Advances in Kinetics and Dynamics, Vol. 1, J.R. Barker, editor (JAI Press, Greenwich, 1992) 139-185.
6. Photoinitiated reactions in weakly bonded complexes: entrance channel specificity; Y. Chen, G. Hoffmann, S.K. Shin, D. Oh, S. Sharpe, Y.P. Zeng, R.A. Beaudet and C. Wittig; Advances in Molecular Vibrations and Collision Dynamics, Vol. 1, Part B, J.M. Bowman, editor (JAI Press, Greenwich, 1992) 187-229.
7. NO(X^{2}Π) product state distributions in molecule-surface dissociative scattering: n,i-C_{3}F_{7}NO from MgO(100); E. Kolodney, P.S. Powers, L. Hodgson, H. Reisler and C. Wittig; Mode Selective Chemistry, J. Jortner et al., editors (Kluwer Academic Publishers, Netherlands, 1991) 443-455.
8. Photoinitiated reactions in weakly bonded complexes; S.K. Shin, Y. Chen, S. Nickolaisen, S.W. Sharpe, R.A. Beaudet and C. Wittig; Advances in Photochemistry, Vol. 16, D. Volman, G. Hammond and D. Neckers, editors (Wiley, 1991) 249-363.
9. Photodissociation processes in NO-containing molecules; H. Reisler, M. Noble and C. Wittig; Molecular Photodissociation Dynamics, J. Baggott and M.N.R. Ashfold, editors (Royal Society of Chemistry, 1987) 139-176.
10. Multiphoton ionization of molecules; H. Reisler and C. Wittig; Advances in Chemical Physics LX, K.P. Lawley, editor (1985) 1-30.

=== Selected articles ===
1. C. Wittig, "The Landau-Zener formula", J. Phys. Chem. B 109, 8428 (2005).
2. J. Underwood, D. Chastaing, S. Lee, and C. Wittig, "Heavy hydrides: H_{2}Te ultraviolet photochemistry", J. Chem. Phys. 123, 84312 (2005).
3. E. Polyakova, D. Stolyarov, and C. Wittig, "Multiple photon excitation and ionization of NO in and on helium droplets", J. Chem. Phys. 124, 214308 (2006).
4. G. Kumi, S. Malyk, S. Hawkins, H. Reisler, and C. Wittig, "Amorphous solid water films: Transport and host–guest interactions with CO_{2} and N_{2}O dopants", J. Phys. Chem. A 110, 2097–2105 (2006).
5. C. Wittig and I. Bezel, "Effective Hamiltonian models and unimolecular decomposition", J. Phys. Chem. B 100, 19850–19860 (2006).
6. S. Malyk, G. Kumi, H. Reisler, and C. Wittig, "Trapping and Release of CO_{2} guest molecules in amorphous ice", J. Phys. Chem. A 111, 13365–13370 (2008).
7. C. Wittig, "Statistics of indistinguishable particles", J. Phys. Chem. A 113, 7244–7252, Benny Gerber Festschrift (2009).
8. L. A. Smith-Freeman, W. H. Schroeder, and C. Wittig, "AsH_{2} ultraviolet photochemistry", J. Phys. Chem. A 113, 2158–2164 (2009).
9. A. Bar-Nun, D. Laufer, O. Rebolledo-Mayoral, S. Malyk, H. Reisler, C. Wittig, "Gas trapping in ice and its release upon warming", Solar System Ices, M. Gudipati, Editor (World Scientific, Singapore, 2010).
10. C. Wittig, "Photon and electron spins", J. Phys. Chem. A 113, 15320–15327, Vincenzo Aquilanti Festschrift (2010).

== Awards and honors ==
- Fellow, American Association for the Advancement of Science (2005);
- Eminent Scholar Lecturer, University of Arizona (2005);
- Raubenheimer Outstanding Faculty Award: Teaching, Research and Service (2003);
- Bourke Lecturer (plus Bourke medal), Royal Society of Chemistry: University of Birmingham, University of Edinburgh, and University of Leeds (2000)
- American Physical Society's Herbert P. Broida Prize Recipient (1993)
