= Robert W. Field =

American chemist

- Born: June 13, 1944 (age 81); Wilmington, Delaware
- Education: Amherst College (A.B.); Harvard University (Ph.D.)
- Awards: Broida Prize (1980); Plyler Prize (1988); Lippincott Award (1990); Schawlow Prize (2009); E. Bright Wilson Award (2012)
- Scientific career
- Institutions: Massachusetts Institute of Technology
- Doctoral advisor: William Klemperer
- Website: chemistry.mit.edu/profile/robert-w-field/

For the painter, see Robert Field (painter)

Robert W. Field (born June 13, 1944) is the Haslam and Dewey Professor of Chemistry at the Massachusetts Institute of Technology, where he has been a professor since 1974. His AB degree is in chemistry from Amherst College, and his PhD is in chemistry from Harvard University, where he worked with Bill Klemperer. He was a postdoc with Herbert Broida at the University of California, Santa Barbara.

== Spectroscopy ==
He is a physical chemist, specializing in spectroscopy of small molecules in the gas phase. He performed the first microwave-optical and optical-optical double resonance experiments on small molecules, and invented the Stimulated Emission Pumping (SEP, or "PUMP and DUMP") spectroscopic method. He is also particularly known for studies of the molecules acetylene (C_{2}H_{2}) and calcium fluoride (CaF) in the gas phase.

His active research group at MIT includes about eight graduate students and postdocs working on experimental, theoretical and computational physical chemistry of small molecules in the gas phase.

== Awards ==
He is the recipient of the Broida Prize (1980), the Plyler Prize (1988), the Lippincott Award (1990), the Arthur L. Schawlow Prize in Laser Science (2009), the E. Bright Wilson Award in Spectroscopy (2012), and the Nobel Laureate Signature Award. He is a Fellow of the American Physical Society, the American Academy of Arts and Sciences, and the National Academy of Sciences.
