= Ellis R. Lippincott Award =

American award in vibrational spectroscopy

The Ellis R. Lippincott Award is awarded annually to recognize "an individual who has made significant contributions to vibrational spectroscopy as judged by his or her influence on other scientists." It was jointly established in 1975 by The Optical Society, The Coblentz Society, and The Society for Applied Spectroscopy. The award honors Ellis R. Lippincott, a vibrational spectroscopist who worked at the University of Maryland. Lippincott was one of the developers of the Diamond anvil cell, which is used in high pressure research.

== Past winners of the Lippincott Award ==
- 2026 Juergen Popp
- 2025 Yukihiro Ozaki
- 2024 Steven G. Boxer
- 2023 Peter R. Griffiths
- 2022 Martin Zanni
- 2021 Rohit Bhargava
- 2020 Volker Deckert
- 2019 Ji-Xin Cheng
- 2018 Peter Hamm
- 2017 Roberto Merlin
- 2016 Thomas Elsaesser
- 2015 Dana D. Dlott
- 2014 Andrei Tokmakoff
- 2013 Xiaoliang Sunney Xie
- 2012 Keith A. Nelson
- 2011 Isao Noda
- 2010 Martin Moskovits
- 2009 Michael D. Fayer
- 2008 Richard P. Van Duyne
- 2007 Jonathan Tennyson
- 2006 Hai-Lung Dai
- 2005 Jaan Laane
- 2004 Richard A. Mathies
- 2003 Shaul Mukamel
- 2002 Sanford A. Asher
- 2001 Lester Andrews
- 2000 Donald Levy
- 1999 Mitsuo Tasumi
- 1998 Takeshi Oka
- 1997 Robin Hochstrasser
- 1996 Giuseppe Zerbi
- 1995 Giacinto Scoles
- 1994 Herbert L. Strauss
- 1993 John F. Rabolt
- 1992 Richard Saykally
- 1990 Robert W. Field
- 1989 Marilyn E. Jacox
- 1988 Andreas C. Albrecht
- 1987 C. Bradley Moore
- 1986 Wolfgang Kaiser
- 1985 Ira W. Levin
- 1984 Jon T. Hougen
- 1983 John Overend
- 1982 Michel Delhaye
- 1981 Ian M. Mills
- 1980 George C. Pimentel
- 1979 E. Bright Wilson
- 1978 Bryce L. Crawford, Jr.
- 1977 Lionel Bellamy
- 1976 Richard C. Lord

== See also ==
- List of physics awards
