= Earle K. Plyler Prize =

Prize awarded annually by the American Physical Society since 1977

The Earle K. Plyler Prize for Molecular Spectroscopy and Dynamics is a prize that has been awarded annually by the American Physical Society since 1977. The recipient is chosen for "notable contributions to the field of molecular spectroscopy and dynamics". The prize is named after Earle K. Plyler, who was a leading experimenter in the field of infrared spectroscopy; as of 2024 it is valued at $10,000. The prize is currently sponsored by the AIP Journal of Chemical Physics.

== Recipients ==
Source: American Physical Society

- 2026: Anne McCoy
- 2025: R. J. Dwayne Miller
- 2024: Anders Nilsson
- 2023: Xiaoyang Zhu
- 2022: Arthur G. Suits
- 2021: Martin T. Zanni
- 2020: Anna Krylov
- 2019: Abraham Nitzan
- 2018: David M. Jonas
- 2017: Albert Stolow
- 2016: Donald G. Truhlar
- 2015: Majed Chergui
- 2014: Lai-Sheng Wang
- 2013: Brooks Pate
- 2012: Andrei Tokmakoff
- 2011: Shaul Mukamel
- 2010: Lester S. Andrews
- 2009: Terry A. Miller
- 2008: Steven G. Boxer
- 2007: Timothy S. Zwier
- 2006: Mark Johnson
- 2005: Robert Tycko
- 2004: Richard P. van Duyne
- 2003: Giacinto Scoles and Kevin K. Lehmann
- 2002: Graham Fleming
- 2001: W. E. Moerner
- 2000: Michael David Fayer
- 1999: David Wixon Pratt
- 1998: F. Fleming Crim
- 1997: David J. Nesbitt and Roger Ervin Miller
- 1996: Charles S. Stedman [sic]
- 1995: James L. Kinsey
- 1994: C. Bradley Moore
- 1993: Ahmed Zewail
- 1992: William Carl Lineberger
- 1991: Kenneth M. Evenson
- 1990: Andreas J. Albrecht
- 1989: Richard J. Saykally
- 1988: Robert W. Field
- 1987: Donald H. Levy
- 1986: James K. G. Watson
- 1985: Gerhard Herzberg
- 1984: John T. Hougen [sic]
- 1983: William Aloys Klemperer
- 1982: Takeshi Oka
- 1981: Richard N. Zare
- 1980: Walter Gordy
- 1979: George C. Pimentel
- 1978: E. Bright Wilson, Jr
- 1977: Charles H. Townes

== See also ==
- List of physics awards
- List of chemistry awards
