= William H. Green =

American chemical engineer (born 1963)

William H. Green Jr.
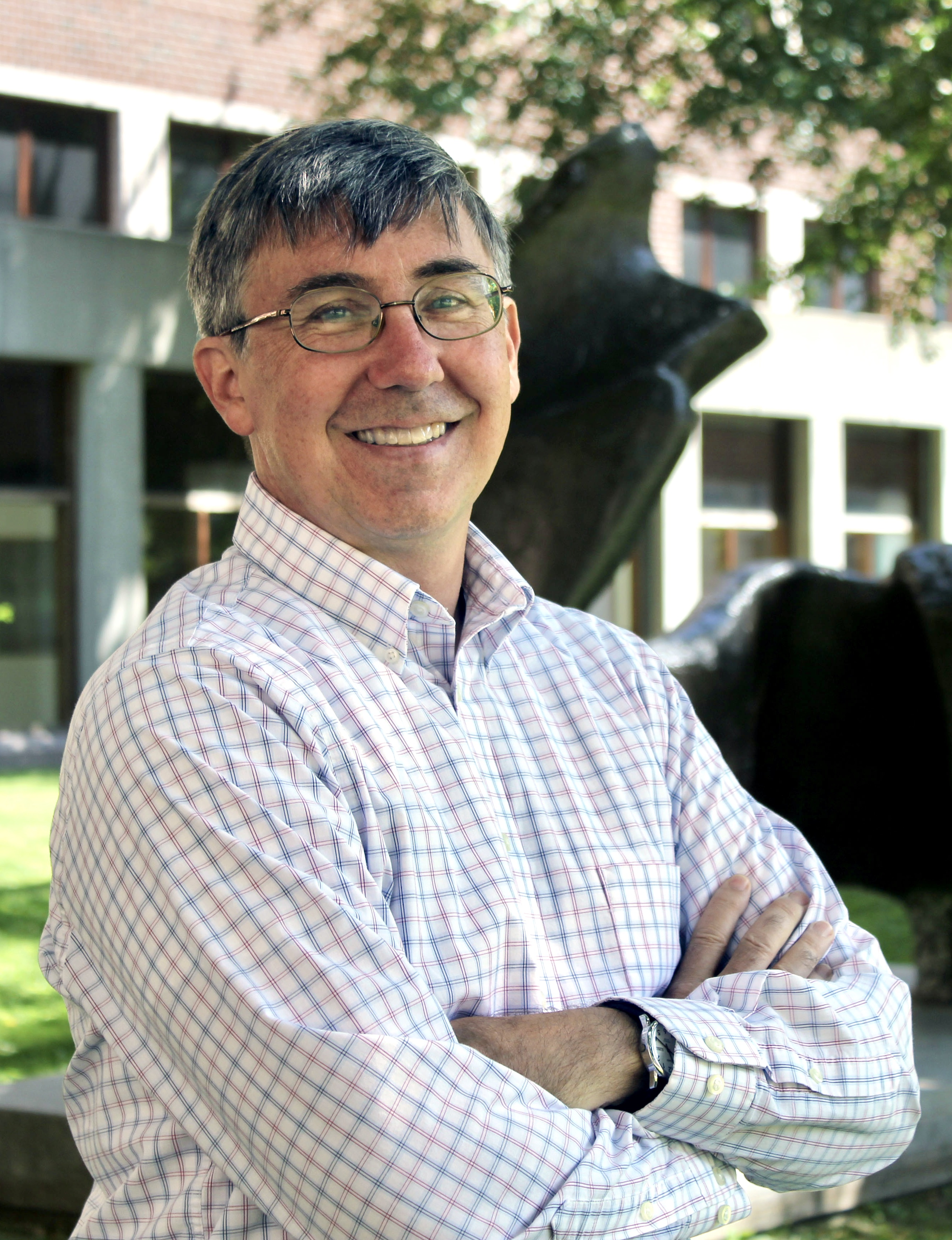
- Born: April 11, 1963 (age 63); Philadelphia, Pennsylvania, United States
- Other name: Bill Green
- Education: Swarthmore College, University of California, Berkeley
- Known for: Computational chemical kinetic modeling, quantum chemistry, fuel chemistry
- Awards: AIChE R. H. Wilhelm Award (2019); ACS’s Glenn Award in Fuel Chemistry (2004, 2009, 2013); C.M. Mohr Award for Outstanding Undergraduate Teaching (2006); Certificate of Merit, ACS Environmental Chemistry Division (2005); E.W. Thiele Lectureship Award, University of Notre Dame (2004); NSF CAREER Award (1999)
- Scientific career
- Fields: Chemical Engineering
- Workplaces: Massachusetts Institute of Technology
- Doctoral advisor: C. Bradley Moore
- Website: greengroup.mit.edu

External videos
- “William Green on Predicting Chemical Reactions”
- “William Green - Combustion and Fuels Chemistry Lecture”

William H. Green Jr. (born April 11, 1963), is a Hoyt C. Hottel Professor of Chemical Engineering at the Massachusetts Institute of Technology, working in the field of chemical reaction engineering.

His research largely focuses on using computers to accurately predict the products and time evolution of systems of reacting chemicals. He has been recognized for “developing and disseminating methods for predictive chemical kinetics based on quantum chemistry”. He published approximately 300 journal papers and book chapters, which have been cited more than 13,000 times.

== Early life ==
Green was born in Philadelphia on April 11, 1963, the eldest of six children of William H. Green (1938–2013) and Marita Roellig Green (b. 1940). He grew up in the Mid-Atlantic states, mostly in Delaware County, Pennsylvania. Green skipped both kindergarten and 4th grade and graduated from Archmere Academy, a private Catholic high school in Delaware, shortly after his 16th birthday. In high school he was the top student in science and shared top honors in math. He was state champion of the Math Olympiad, and he received the Delaware Valley Science Council's Excellence in Chemistry Award. While in high school he was also the editor of his high school literary magazine and of a Boy Scout newsletter. His interest in physical chemistry was kindled by his teacher Dr. Stanley F. Sarner, an expert in rocket propellant chemistry.

== Education ==
Green graduated with Highest Honors in Science and Engineering from Swarthmore College in 1983. For his undergraduate thesis research he built a molecular beam instrument under the direction of Carol Cuzens Kahler and used it to measure the effect of rotational energy on the rate of the reaction NO + ozone, his first journal publication. While at Swarthmore, he was also a news editor of the student newspaper and co-led the Nuclear War Education Project.

Green received an National Science Foundation fellowship to attend graduate school in physical chemistry at the University of California, Berkeley. At Berkeley, he did his PhD thesis under the supervision of C. Bradley Moore. For his thesis, he measured and analyzed the spectra of highly vibrationally excited molecules, and, with fellow student I-Chia Chen, he measured and interpreted the photofragment excitation spectra of ketene. The latter experiments were the first to very clearly demonstrate that the energy-resolved relative rates of formation of different product channels are quantized, as predicted by RRKM theory. This work attracted press attention, was the subject of an article in Annual Review of Physical Chemistry and is discussed in textbooks on unimolecular reaction rates. In 1996 Klippenstein and Allen used this data to validate Klippenstein's first-principles method of calculating rates for barrierless reactions.

After earning his Ph.D. in 1988, Green received fellowships from the National Science Foundation, NATO, and Darwin College to do postdoctoral research in theoretical chemistry at Cambridge University with Nicholas C. Handy. During that time he developed first-principles methods for calculating molecular spectra, working on the program SPECTRO with Andrew Willets and on the Renner-Teller molecule singlet methylene with Stuart Carter and Peter Knowles. In early 1991 he did postdoctoral work with Marsha I. Lester at the University of Pennsylvania, developing a framework for interpreting the spectra of van der Waals complexes of free radicals.

== Research career ==
From 1991 – 1997 Green was a principal investigator for Exxon Corporate Research. During that time he was one of the first to apply density functional theory to open-shell molecules and their reactions. With David Avila and Keith Usherwood Ingold he discovered and explained a strong solvent effect on certain types of free radical reactions, and with Roberta Susnow, Anthony M. Dean, and Linda Broadbelt he invented the rate-based algorithm for constructing reaction networks appropriate to the local reaction conditions.

In 1997 he joined the chemical engineering faculty at MIT. His research group developed the open-source Reaction Mechanism Generator software, which allows anyone to rapidly construct accurate kinetic models for many gas-phase and some liquid phase reaction systems. Most of the parameter values in this software come from quantum chemistry calculations, many performed by Green's group at MIT. Although there were many related prior works that laid the groundwork, the Reaction Mechanism Generator was a significant advance over the prior state of the art, making it much easier to construct reliable chemical kinetic models for complicated systems. This is a key part in achieving the long-term goal of many researchers to make it possible to predict what will happen in chemical reactions before doing any experiments. In order to develop this software, Green and his students invented many algorithms, approximations, and estimation methods. The computer-generated kinetic models often include thousands of reactions, and Green collaborated with his colleague Paul Barton and others to develop numerical methods for solving or simplifying those very large models.

Green and his students used these new methods to predict a wide variety of systems, many of them including pyrolysis or combustion. The model predictions were tested against a variety of experimental data, mostly measured by others, but some measured in Green's lab at MIT. His group also constructed a unique instrument combining flash photolysis, vacuum ultraviolet photoionization mass spectrometry, and long-path laser absorption, making it possible to measure both rates and product branching ratios simultaneously, in order to test calculations on individual reactions. Green also held leading roles in several research projects of MIT's Energy Initiative, including the Mobility of the Future Study. Green also received some patents for his work at MIT, most notably a method for converting toxic H2S into valuable H2.

Very recently, Green has developed ways for using machine learning to predict the properties of molecules and the major products of chemical reactions. This made it possible to develop a computer program which can suggest good synthetic pathways for producing most small and moderate-size molecules. Most of this work was done in collaboration with Klavs F. Jensen and their PhD student Connor Coley, and much of the work was summarized in an article in Accounts of Chemical Research. That work received press attention, and Coley received multiple awards.

=== Notable accomplishments ===
In recognition of his research accomplishments, Green was named editor-in-chief of the International Journal of Chemical Kinetics in 2008, and was appointed the Hoyt C. Hottel Chair of Chemical Engineering in 2009. He has received many awards, including the ACS's Glenn Award in Fuel Chemistry (3 times in 2004, 2009, 2013) and the AIChE's R. H. Wilhelm Award in 2019, the top annual prize in the field of chemical reaction engineering. He was elected a Fellow of the American Association for the Advancement of Science in 2016, and a Fellow of the Combustion Institute in 2018.

Green is also a co-founder of Thiozen, a start-up company seeking to commercialize a method of converting H2S into hydrogen that Green co-invented with Ryan Gillis.

Green published approximately 300 journal papers and book chapters, which by 2020 had been cited more than 13,000 times. Eighteen of his former PhD and postdoctoral students have been appointed to faculty positions, and several of them have won awards for their research.

While Green is best known for his research, he won the Mohr Award for Outstanding Teaching of Undergraduates as well, and he served as Executive Officer of the MIT Chemical Engineering Department 2012–2015.

== Personal life ==
Green is married to Amanda Cheetham Green, an educator. They met when they both worked on the Archmere Academy literary magazine, both graduated from Swarthmore College, and they married in 1985. Together they raised three children who are now adults.

Green's father William H. Green was a radiologist and a leader in the local medical community. For example, he was the President of the Philadelphia Roentgen Ray Society 1986-1987 and the society's 1998 Annual Oration was given in his honor. His mother Marita Roellig Green was and is a leader in local organizations; her many volunteer works include being a leader of the Delaware County League of Women Voters and of the Philadelphia chapter of Voice of the Faithful. Their ancestors immigrated to the United States in the 19th century from what is now Ireland, Germany, and the United Kingdom. His parents were both highly educated, but none of his grandparents nor any earlier generations of his family ever attended college.

Green's sister Marita Green Lind received an honorary doctorate in 2008 for her work with children who have been abused.
