= Andreas Albrecht =

Andreas Albrecht may refer to:

- Andreas Albrecht (cosmologist), theoretical physicist and cosmologist
- Andreas Albrecht (mathematician) (1586–1628), German mathematician and engineer
- Andreas Albrecht (chemist) (1927–2002), American physical chemist
