= Takeshi Oka =

Japanese–American astrochemist (born 1932)

- 岡 武史
- Born: 1932 (age 93–94); Tokyo, Japan
- Citizenship: Canada; U.S.
- Education: University of Tokyo
- Known for: Discovering the Trihydrogen cation (H^{+}_{3}); Hydronium; Methanium
- Awards: Earle K. Plyler Prize (1982); William F. Meggers Award (1997); Ellis R. Lippincott Award (1998); E. Bright Wilson Award in Spectroscopy (2002); Davy Medal (2004)
- Scientific career
- Fields: Astrochemistry
- Workplaces: University of Tokyo; National Research Council of Canada; University of Chicago
- Academic advisors: Gerhard Herzberg
- Doctoral students: Moungi Bawendi

Takeshi Oka (岡 武史, Oka Takeshi; born 1932), FRS FRSC, is a Japanese-American spectroscopist and astronomer specializing in the field of galactic astronomy, known as a pioneer of astrochemistry and the co-discoverer of interstellar trihydrogen cation (H^{+}_{3}). He is now R.A. Milliken Distinguished Service Emeritus Professor, Departments of Astronomy and Astrophysics, Chemistry; Enrico Fermi Institute; and the College of University of Chicago.

== Education ==
Oka received his BS and PhD degrees in 1955 and 1960, respectively, at the University of Tokyo.

== Career ==
From 1960 to 1963, Oka was a JSPS Fellow at the University of Tokyo, and in 1963, he was a postdoctoral fellow along with Harry Kroto and J.K.G.Watson, among others, in Gerhard Herzberg's spectroscopy laboratory at the National Research Council of Canada. Afterward, he successively worked at the National Research Council of Canada (1964–1981), and at the University of Chicago (1981–). His research group is concerned with the study of the quantum mechanics and dynamics of fundamental molecular ions and their behavior in astronomical objects.

In 1980, at the National Research Council of Canada, Oka discovered the infrared spectrum of H^{+}_{3}. which is thought to be the starting point for gas phase chemistry in interstellar "molecular clouds." Following a lengthy search Thomas R. Geballe and Oka detected the infrared spectrum of H^{+}_{3} in two interstellar clouds. Since then Oka and his colleagues have published numerous papers on their observations of interstellar H^{+}_{3}.

== Recognition ==
Oka was on the list of ChemBank's prediction for the 2015 Nobel Prize in Chemistry.

=== Awards ===
- 2004 - Davy Medal.
- 2004 - Norman MacLean Faculty Award.
- 2002 - E. Bright Wilson Award in Spectroscopy
- 1998 - Ellis R. Lippincott Award.
- 1997 - William F. Meggers Award.
- 1990 - Burlington Northern Achievement Award.
- 1982 - Earle K. Plyler Prize for Molecular Spectroscopy
- 1973 - Steacie Prize.

=== Titles ===
- 2004 - Wei Lun Visiting Professorship.
- 2004 - Honorary DSc from the University College London.
- 2003 - Earl W. McDaniel Lecture Georgia Institute of Technology.
- 2001 - Honoris caua, University of Waterloo.
- 2000 - George Pimentel Memorial Lecture, University of California, Berkeley.
- 1998 - Medaili Jana Marca Marci.
- 1997 - Distinguished JILA Visitor.
- 1995 - Golden Jubilee Lecture, Tata Institute of Fundamental Research.
- 1992 - Special Issue, Journal of Molecular Spectroscopy, Vol. 153.
- 1992 - Lecturer, International School of Physics, "Enrico Fermi".
- 1992 - Lord Lecturer, Massachusetts Institute of Technology.
- 1989 - McDowell Lecturer, University of British Columbia.
- 1985-1986 - Chancellor's Distinguished Lecturer, University of California, Berkeley.
- 1981-1982 - Centenary Lecturer, Royal Society.

=== Membership in learned societies ===
- Fellow, American Academy of Arts and Sciences
- Fellow, American Physical Society
- Fellow, Optical Society of America
- Fellow, Royal Society of London
- Fellow, Royal Society of Canada

== Publications ==
- Oka, Takeshi (1980-08-18). "Observation of the Infrared Spectrum of H^{+}_{3}". Physical Review Letters. 45 (7). American Physical Society (APS): 531–534. Bibcode:1980PhRvL..45..531O. doi:10.1103/physrevlett.45.531. ISSN 0031-9007.
- Geballe, T. R.; Oka, T. (1996). "Detection of H^{+}_{3} in interstellar space". Nature. 384 (6607). Springer Science and Business Media LLC: 334–335. Bibcode:1996Natur.384..334G. doi:10.1038/384334a0. ISSN 0028-0836. PMID 8934516. S2CID 4370842.
- Gottfried, Jennifer L.; Oka, Takeshi (2004-12-15). "Near-infrared electronic spectrum of CH_{2}^{+}". The Journal of Chemical Physics. 121 (23). AIP Publishing: 11527–11529. Bibcode:2004JChPh.12111527G. doi:10.1063/1.1835265. ISSN 0021-9606. PMID 15634116.
- Tarsitano, Christopher G.; Neese, Christopher F.; Oka, Takeshi (2004). "High-resolution spectroscopy of the 2^{2}Π_{u}←X^{4}Σ_{g−} forbidden transitions of C_{2}^{+}". The Journal of Chemical Physics. 121 (13). AIP Publishing: 6290–6297. doi:10.1063/1.1787493. ISSN 0021-9606. PMID 15446923.
- Hobbs, L. M.; Thorburn, J. A.; Oka, T.; Barentine, J.; Snow, T. P.; York, D. G. (2004-11-10). "Atomic and Molecular Emission Lines from the Red Rectangle". The Astrophysical Journal. 615 (2). IOP Publishing: 947–957. Bibcode:2004ApJ...615..947H. doi:10.1086/424733. ISSN 0004-637X.
- Oka, Takeshi; Epp, Erik (2004-09-20). "The Nonthermal Rotational Distribution of $H^{+}_{3}$". The Astrophysical Journal. 613 (1). IOP Publishing: 349–354. Bibcode:2004ApJ...613..349O. doi:10.1086/423030. ISSN 0004-637X.
- Oka, Takeshi (2004). "Nuclear spin selection rules in chemical reactions by angular momentum algebra". Journal of Molecular Spectroscopy. 228 (2). Elsevier BV: 635–639. Bibcode:2004JMoSp.228..635O. doi:10.1016/j.jms.2004.08.015. ISSN 0022-2852.
- Gottfried, Jennifer L.; McCall, Benjamin J.; Oka, Takeshi (2003-06-22). "Near-infrared spectroscopy of H3+ above the barrier to linearity". The Journal of Chemical Physics. 118 (24). AIP Publishing: 10890–10899. Bibcode:2003JChPh.11810890G. doi:10.1063/1.1575737. ISSN 0021-9606.
- Oka, Takeshi; Thorburn, Julie A.; McCall, Benjamin J.; Friedman, Scott D.; Hobbs, Lewis M.; Sonnentrucker, Paule; Welty, Daniel E.; York, Donald G. (2003-01-10). "Observations of C_{3} in Translucent Sight Lines". The Astrophysical Journal. 582 (2). IOP Publishing: 823–829. Bibcode:2003ApJ...582..823O. doi:10.1086/344726. ISSN 0004-637X.
- Goto, Miwa; McCall, Benjamin J.; Geballe, Thomas R.; Usuda, Tomonori; Kobayashi, Naoto; Terada, Hiroshi; Oka, Takeshi (2002-12-25). "Absorption Line Survey of H_{3}^{+} toward the Galactic Center Sources I. GCS 3-2 and GC IRS3". Publications of the Astronomical Society of Japan. 54 (6). Oxford University Press (OUP): 951–961. arXiv:astro-ph/0212159. doi:10.1093/pasj/54.6.951. ISSN 0004-6264.
- McCall, B. J.; Hinkle, K. H.; Geballe, T. R.; Moriarty-Schieven, G. H.; Evans II, N. J.; Kawaguchi, K.; Takano, S.; Smith, V. V.; Oka, T. (2002). "Observations of H_{3}^{+} in the Diffuse Interstellar Medium". The Astrophysical Journal. 567 (1). IOP Publishing: 391–406. arXiv:astro-ph/0110674. Bibcode:2002ApJ...567..391M. doi:10.1086/338380. ISSN 0004-637X. S2CID 118470478.
- Momose, Takamasa; Lindsay, C. Michael; Zhang, Yu; Oka, Takeshi (2001-05-21). "Sharp Spectral Lines Observed in γ-Ray Ionized Parahydrogen Crystals". Physical Review Letters. 86 (21). American Physical Society (APS): 4795–4798. Bibcode:2001PhRvL..86.4795M. doi:10.1103/physrevlett.86.4795. hdl:2433/50041. ISSN 0031-9007. PMID 11384350.
- White, E. T.; Tang, Jian; Oka, Takeshi (1999-04-02). "CH_{5}^{+}: The Infrared Spectrum Observed". Science. 284 (5411). American Association for the Advancement of Science (AAAS): 135–137. Bibcode:1999Sci...284..135W. doi:10.1126/science.284.5411.135. ISSN 0036-8075. PMID 10102811.

== See also ==
- List of fellows of the Royal Society M, N, O
- List of fellows of the Royal Society elected in 1984
