= Anders Nilsson (scientist) =

Scientist

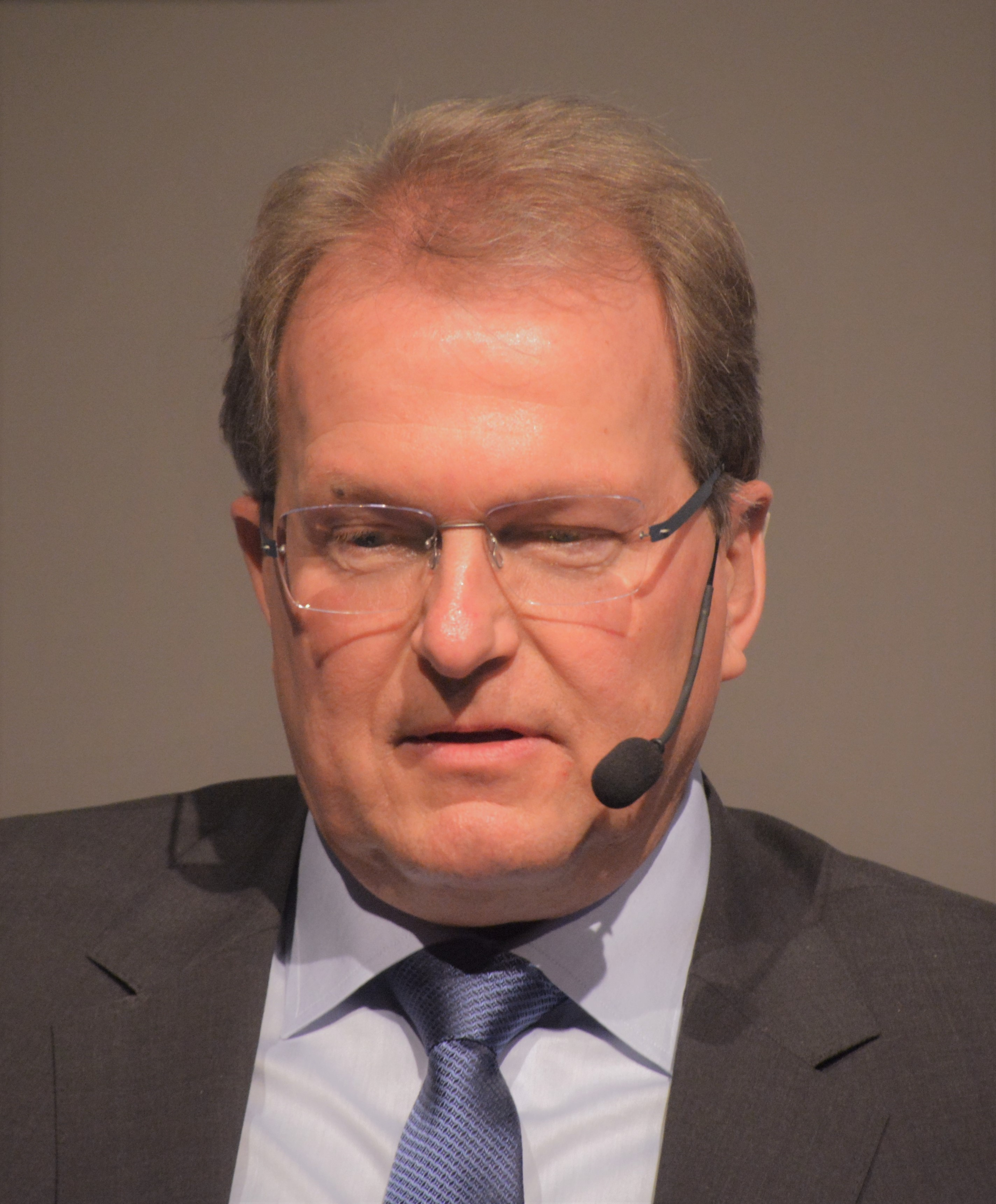
Anders Nilsson

Anders Nilsson (born 1956) is a Swedish chemical physicist. He is professor of chemical physics at Stockholm University and professor of photon science, emeritus, at Stanford University. His research focuses on the structure and dynamics of water and the origin of its unusual physical properties, and on chemical bonding and reactions on surfaces, including catalysis.

His work uses X-ray spectroscopy and X-ray scattering at synchrotron light sources and X-ray free-electron lasers. He has applied these methods both to water and to chemical reactions on catalyst surfaces, including measurements on femtosecond timescales and studies of catalysts under operating conditions, such as iron and ruthenium catalysts during ammonia synthesis by the Haber–Bosch process. His group's 2004 study of hydrogen bonding in liquid water was among the research on water that Science named one of its ten breakthroughs of that year, and in 2026 his group and collaborators reported experimental evidence for a liquid–liquid critical point in supercooled water. He received the Earle K. Plyler Prize for Molecular Spectroscopy and Dynamics of the American Physical Society in 2024.

== Education ==
At secondary school Nilsson was mainly interested in chemistry and physics, and in 1975 he completed a four-year program in chemistry in Stockholm. He received his MSc in chemical engineering from the Royal Institute of Technology (KTH) in Stockholm in 1980. He worked at KTH as a teaching assistant in physical chemistry (1978–1981) and research assistant (1980), and as a research assistant at the Institute for Surface Chemistry in Stockholm (1981), and in 1982 he was a visiting scientist in chemical engineering at Imperial College London.

He received his PhD in physics from Uppsala University in 1989, working in the laboratory founded by the Nobel laureate Kai Siegbahn, with a thesis on core-level electron spectroscopy of surfaces and adsorbates.

== Career ==
After his doctorate Nilsson remained at Uppsala University as a research assistant (1989–1992) and then senior researcher (1993–1998), and became a docent in physics in 1992. At Uppsala he supervised doctoral students and worked with Nils Mårtensson on experiments at the first MAX synchrotron laboratory in Lund. In 1993 he was a visiting scientist at the Stanford Synchrotron Radiation Laboratory, and from 1994 to 1997 he was a visiting scientist at the Advanced Light Source at Lawrence Berkeley National Laboratory. He became a lecturer at Uppsala in 1999 and professor of physics in 2000.

In 2000 Nilsson moved to Stanford University as associate professor in synchrotron radiation research; he held the Uppsala professorship until 2001. He became professor of photon science at Stanford in 2008. From 2001 to 2011 he was also a guest professor in chemical physics at Stockholm University, dividing his time between the two universities. He chaired the photon science faculty at Stanford from 2010 to 2013, and as deputy director for experiments led the experimental program of the SUNCAT Center for Interface Science and Catalysis, a partnership between SLAC National Accelerator Laboratory and Stanford, from its founding in 2010 until 2014.

In 2014 Stockholm University recruited him back to Sweden with funding from the Swedish Research Council. The university said the recruitment would strengthen its atomic and molecular physics research, and SUNCAT noted its importance for research based on X-ray free-electron lasers and for the MAX IV synchrotron. He became professor of chemical physics at Stockholm University in June 2014, after 14 years at Stanford. There he leads the research group Experimental X-ray Studies of Liquids and Surfaces (XSoLaS).

Nilsson chaired, with Stefano Bonetti as co-chair, a Swedish working group formed in 2015 that prepared the science case for a soft X-ray free-electron laser at the MAX IV Laboratory. He is a member of the Scientific Advisory Board of the Fritz Haber Institute of the Max Planck Society in Berlin, and was listed among its members for the board's 2022 and 2025 meetings.

== Research ==
Much of Nilsson's research uses core-level X-ray spectroscopy, which probes the electronic structure around a single, chosen atom; his studies of water also rely on X-ray scattering. He has applied these techniques to chemical bonds between molecules and metal surfaces and to the hydrogen-bond network of liquid water. With X-ray free-electron lasers, he followed surface reactions on femtosecond timescales and used ultrafast X-ray scattering to study supercooled water. In a review written for the 60th anniversary of the journal Surface Science, he grouped his surface work into three areas: mapping the surface chemical bond, following surface reactions in real time, and probing catalysts under operating ("operando") conditions.

=== Chemical bonding at surfaces ===
Nilsson and his collaborators combined X-ray emission and X-ray absorption spectroscopy with density functional theory calculations to obtain an atom-specific picture of how adsorbed molecules bond to metal surfaces. Because the X-ray emission signal is projected onto the adsorbed atom, the method separates the adsorbate's share of the surface bond from that of the metal. This made it possible to observe directly the bonding and antibonding states described by the d-band model of surface reactivity. A 2004 review with the theoretical chemical physicist Lars G. M. Pettersson summarised the approach for adsorbates ranging from atoms and diatomic molecules, such as carbon monoxide and nitrogen, to hydrocarbons and molecules that bond through lone pairs, such as glycine. In 2008 Nilsson, Pettersson and Jens K. Nørskov edited the book Chemical Bonding at Surfaces and Interfaces.

=== Structure of liquid water ===
In 2004 a team led by Nilsson at the Stanford Synchrotron Radiation Laboratory and Stockholm University used X-ray absorption spectroscopy and X-ray Raman scattering to study the nearest neighbours of molecules in liquid water. They concluded that most molecules form two strong hydrogen bonds, one donated and one accepted, rather than the average of about 3.5 assumed in the prevailing picture. This implied that the liquid consists largely of hydrogen-bonded chains or rings within a disordered network. The study was among the research on water that Science collectively named one of its ten breakthroughs of 2004.

The interpretation was disputed. Later in 2004 a group led by Richard Saykally at Berkeley argued, from its own X-ray absorption measurements, that the spectra could be explained by small distortions of an ice-like, tetrahedral hydrogen-bond network. In a technical comment published in Science in 2005, Nilsson and his co-authors challenged that analysis, arguing that the Berkeley group's temperature-dependent spectra were affected by nonlinear saturation effects and questioning its assumption that specific hydrogen-bonding configurations could be resolved in the spectra; Saykally's group replied in the same issue. The structure of water and the origin of its anomalies have remained an active debate, and in 2016 Pettersson, Richard Henchman and Nilsson introduced a thematic issue of Chemical Reviews on water as "the most anomalous liquid".

=== Supercooled water and the liquid–liquid critical point ===
Nilsson's group later used X-ray free-electron lasers to study water cooled below its freezing point. In 2014, using the Linac Coherent Light Source at SLAC to probe evaporatively cooled micrometre-sized droplets, they made what SLAC described as the first structural measurements of liquid water in "no man's land", the temperature range where ice normally forms too quickly to be measured, down to about −46 °C. The work was featured on the cover of Nature.

In 2017 the group reported maxima in water's compressibility and correlation length at about 229 K (−44 °C), which they interpreted as evidence of a Widom line extending from a liquid–liquid critical point at positive pressure. In another 2017 study, they used X-ray photon correlation spectroscopy to follow high-density amorphous ice as it turned into the low-density form, and found diffusive, liquid-like motion during the transition. Discover magazine listed the group's 2017 findings on water's two liquid states among the 100 top scientific discoveries of the year. The water research from 2015 to 2020 was supported in part by a European Research Council Advanced Grant (project WATER).

In 2020 Nilsson, Kyung Hwan Kim, Katrin Amann-Winkel, Fivos Perakis and colleagues heated high-density amorphous ice with a femtosecond infrared laser to make supercooled liquid water at about 205 K under an estimated 2.5–3.5 kbar, and followed its rapid expansion with femtosecond X-ray pulses. They observed a discontinuous structural change, which they interpreted as a transition between a high-density and a low-density liquid. In 2026 the same collaboration, using experiments at the PAL-XFEL facility in South Korea, reported evidence of a liquid–liquid critical point in supercooled water at about 210 K (−63 °C) and an estimated 1,000 bar, including enhanced density fluctuations and a rise in heat capacity near that point. In Physics Today, Francesco Paesani of the University of California, San Diego, described it as the closest an experiment had come to locating the critical point directly, while noting that open questions remained. The group's supercooled-water experiments have also been covered by Physics World.

=== Ultrafast surface chemistry ===
At SLAC, Nilsson led experiments that used the Linac Coherent Light Source to follow reactions on catalyst surfaces in real time: an optical laser pulse started the reaction and femtosecond X-ray pulses probed the electronic structure of the adsorbed molecules. In 2013 the team observed carbon monoxide molecules on a ruthenium surface becoming trapped in a short-lived, weakly bound "precursor" state that precedes desorption, a state that had long been proposed but not previously observed. In 2015 they reported what SLAC described as the first glimpse of the transition state in the catalytic oxidation of carbon monoxide on ruthenium. Many reacting pairs reached the transition-state region, but only a small fraction went on to form carbon dioxide.

=== Catalysis under operating conditions ===
At Stanford, his group built an electrochemical cell for photoelectron spectroscopy to study fuel-cell and water-splitting electrocatalysis. In a 2013 study of a working polymer-electrolyte fuel cell, the team observed hydroxyl intermediates in several configurations, hydrated and non-hydrated, on the platinum cathode during oxygen reduction. At Stockholm University the group developed POLARIS, an X-ray photoelectron spectroscopy instrument that can measure catalyst surfaces at pressures of around 1 bar, which DESY described as ten times higher than possible at other synchrotron light sources. The instrument is used at beamline P22 of the PETRA III synchrotron at DESY in Hamburg.

In 2022 the group used POLARIS to determine the chemical state of zinc on a copper–zinc model catalyst during the synthesis of methanol from carbon dioxide, carbon monoxide and hydrogen, finding that zinc is present mainly as zinc oxide in gas rich in carbon dioxide, whereas carbon monoxide promotes a surface zinc–copper alloy. In 2024 they reported surface-sensitive measurements of iron and ruthenium single-crystal model catalysts while they produced ammonia by the Haber–Bosch reaction, at pressures up to 1 bar and temperatures up to 723 K; Stockholm University and DESY described these as the first such measurements under ammonia-production conditions. The process has been connected with three Nobel Prizes (1918, 1931 and 2007), but because surface-sensitive techniques required vacuum, mechanistic studies of the catalyst surface had long been limited mainly to theoretical calculations. The measurements showed that the catalyst surfaces remain metallic. On ruthenium the rate-limiting step is always nitrogen dissociation, whereas on iron it changes from nitrogen dissociation to the hydrogenation of surface species as the temperature is lowered.

== Honours and awards ==
- 1988 – Liljevalls Award for young scientists, Uppsala
- 1990 – Ångström Award for an outstanding PhD thesis, Uppsala
- 1991 – Lindbomska Award, Royal Swedish Academy of Sciences
- 1994 – Royal Oscar Award, Uppsala University
- 1998 – Shirley Award for research using soft X-rays, Berkeley
- 2004 – Fellow of the Institute of Physics
- 2005 – Special award of the Swedish Foundation for Strategic Research, for the inclusion of his water research among Science's top ten breakthroughs of 2004
- 2009 – Humboldt Research Award, Alexander von Humboldt Foundation
- 2015 – Honorary doctorate, Technical University of Denmark, for his work in surface physics, ultrafast chemistry and the structure of liquid and solid water using X-ray spectroscopy
- 2015 – Morino Lectureship Award, Japan
- 2021 – DTU Ørsted Lecture, Technical University of Denmark
- 2024 – Earle K. Plyler Prize for Molecular Spectroscopy and Dynamics, American Physical Society, "for seminal contributions in the application of x-ray spectroscopy methods to the molecular dynamics of water and catalytic reactions"

== Other activities ==
In December 2018 Nilsson was a panellist at the Nobel Week Dialogue "Water Matters" in Stockholm, speaking in a session on the nature of water with Andre Geim and K. Barry Sharpless. He has also taken part in television documentaries about water, including the episode "Does the Ocean Think?" of the Science Channel series Through the Wormhole with Morgan Freeman (2014) and the science documentary Water – the Strangest Liquid, which follows experiments by his group alongside theoretical work by Francesco Sciortino.

Nilsson has a long-standing interest in spirituality. In 2014 he published The Gentle Way of the Heart, a guide to spiritual awakening in which, according to Foreword Reviews, he describes his own transformation from a "science fundamentalist" to a teacher of spiritual principles. The book was a finalist in the spirituality category of the 2014 USA Best Book Awards. His hobbies include diving and snorkelling.

== Books ==
- Nilsson, Anders; Pettersson, Lars G. M.; Nørskov, Jens K., eds. (2008). Chemical Bonding at Surfaces and Interfaces. Amsterdam: Elsevier. ISBN 978-0-444-52837-7.
- Nilsson, Anders (2014). The Gentle Way of the Heart: Discover the Light Within. Nordic Light Books.

== Selected publications ==
- Nilsson, A.; Pettersson, L. G. M. (2004). "Chemical bonding on surfaces probed by X-ray emission spectroscopy and density functional theory". Surface Science Reports. 55 (2–5): 49–167.
- Wernet, Ph.; et al.; Nilsson, A. (2004). "The structure of the first coordination shell in liquid water". Science. 304 (5673): 995–999.
- Dell'Angela, M.; et al.; Nilsson, A. (2013). "Real-time observation of surface bond breaking with an X-ray laser". Science. 339 (6125): 1302–1305.
- Sanchez Casalongue, H.; et al.; Nilsson, A.; Ogasawara, H. (2013). "Direct observation of the oxygenated species during oxygen reduction on a platinum fuel cell cathode". Nature Communications. 4: 2817.
- Sellberg, J. A.; et al.; Nilsson, A. (2014). "Ultrafast X-ray probing of water structure below the homogeneous ice nucleation temperature". Nature. 510 (7505): 381–384.
- Öström, H.; et al.; Nilsson, A. (2015). "Probing the transition state region in catalytic CO oxidation on Ru". Science. 347 (6225): 978–982.
- Perakis, F.; et al.; Nilsson, A. (2017). "Diffusive dynamics during the high-to-low density transition in amorphous ice". Proceedings of the National Academy of Sciences. 114 (31): 8193–8198.
- Kim, K. H.; et al.; Nilsson, A. (2017). "Maxima in the thermodynamic response and correlation functions of deeply supercooled water". Science. 358 (6370): 1589–1593.
- Kim, K. H.; et al.; Nilsson, A. (2020). "Experimental observation of the liquid-liquid transition in bulk supercooled water under pressure". Science. 370 (6519): 978–982.
- Amann, P.; et al.; Nilsson, A. (2022). "The state of zinc in methanol synthesis over a Zn/ZnO/Cu(211) model catalyst". Science. 376 (6593): 603–608.
- Goodwin, C. M.; et al.; Nilsson, A. (2024). "Operando probing of the surface chemistry during the Haber–Bosch process". Nature. 625 (7994): 282–286.
- You, S.; et al.; Nilsson, A. (2026). "Experimental evidence of a liquid-liquid critical point in supercooled water". Science. 391 (6792): 1387–1391.
