= Katherine Willets =

American chemist and professor

Katherine A. Willets
- Education: Stanford University; Dartmouth College
- Scientific career
- Workplaces: Temple University; Northwestern University
- Thesis: Novel fluorophore systems for single-molecule spectroscopy photophysics, mechanism, and applications (2005)
- Doctoral advisor: William E. Moerner
- Website: Willets Lab

Katherine "Kallie" A. Willets is an American chemist who is a professor of physical chemistry at Temple University. She develops characterization techniques to better understand materials and heterogeneity at interfaces.

== Early life and education ==
Willets studied chemistry at Dartmouth College, where she was awarded the Paul R. Shafer & Douglas M. Bowen Award for outstanding performance as a chemistry teaching assistant. She moved to Stanford University for graduate studies, where she researched fluorophores for single-molecule spectroscopy alongside William E. Moerner. She moved to Northwestern University for postdoctoral research, where she worked with Richard P. Van Duyne. Willets started her independent scientific career at University of Texas at Austin in 2007.

== Research and career ==
Willets started her lab at the Temple University in 2007. Willets develops advanced characterization techniques to understand how heterogeneity at the nanoscale impacts the properties of materials. Amongst these techniques, Willets has developed single-molecule fluorescence microscopy and surface-enhanced Raman spectroscopy. Plasmonic nanostructures are widely recognized for their capacity to capture light and convert it into other energy forms, such as heat and chemical energy generated by high-energy charge carriers (hot electrons and hot holes). These energetic carriers, together with the localized temperature rise at nanoparticle surfaces, can significantly enhance the efficiency of light-driven electrochemical reactions. She pioneers the development of plasmonic nanostructures, and studies how they interact with light for sensing and catalysis.

In 2024, Willets was awarded $20 million in funding from the National Science Foundation to create The Center for Single-Entity Nanochemistry and Nanocrystal Design (CSENND), which will explore the behavior of nanocrystals and how they can be applied to future technologies.

Willets has won several awards for her efforts in chemistry education and improve research culture in chemistry.

== Selected publications ==
- Katherine A Willets; Richard P Van Duyne (1 January 2007). "Localized surface plasmon resonance spectroscopy and sensing". Annual Review of Physical Chemistry. 58: 267–297. Bibcode:2007ARPC...58..267W. doi:10.1146/annurev.physchem.58.032806.104607. ISSN 0066-426X. PMID 17067281. Wikidata Q36635558.
- Judith Langer; Dorleta Jiménez de Aberasturi; Javier Aizpurua; et al. (8 October 2019). "Present and Future of Surface-Enhanced Raman Scattering". ACS Nano. 14 (1): 28–117. doi:10.1021/acsnano.9b04224. ISSN 1936-0851. PMC 6990571. PMID 31478375. Wikidata Q93067707.
- Sarah M Stranahan; Katherine A Willets (1 September 2010). "Super-resolution optical imaging of single-molecule SERS hot spots". Nano Letters. 10 (9): 3777–3784. doi:10.1021/nl102559d. ISSN 1530-6984. PMID 20718441. Wikidata Q84759088.
