= Carbon engineering =

Carbon engineering may refer to:

- Greenhouse gas removal
- Carbon dioxide removal
- Carbon dioxide scrubber
- Carbon Engineering, a Canadian company
