= Linda Peteanu =

American chemist and academic

- Education: Barnard College; University of Chicago
- Scientific career
- Workplaces: Carnegie Mellon University; University of California, Berkeley
- Thesis: Spectroscopy of biological molecules and their clusters (1989)
- Doctoral advisor: Donald Levy

Linda A. Peteanu is an American chemist who is a professor and head of the department of chemistry at Carnegie Mellon University. Her research considers the steady state and transient photophysics of conjugated molecules.

== Early life and education ==
Peteanu was an undergraduate student at Barnard College, where she completed a double major in chemistry and biochemistry. She served as editor of the Barnard Bulletin. She moved to the University of Chicago for her doctoral research, where she worked alongside Donald Levy on the development of electronic spectroscopy of molecular beams. She was a postdoctoral researcher at the University of California, Berkeley, using Raman spectroscopy to unravel photo-isomerization in rhodopsin.

== Research and career ==
Peteanu started her independent career at the Carnegie Mellon University in 1983. Her research considers the development and study of conjugated carbon-based materials for organic electronics. To optimize these systems, she makes use of various steady-state and spectroscopic probes. She has extensively developed Stark spectroscopy, a technique which enables the investigation of charge transfer and delocalisation. The technique applies an electric field to molecular thin films and examines the impact on absorption or emission. She has shown that the application of an applied electric field (e.g. those found in OLEDs) can quench the emission of the conjugated molecules, which impacts the efficiency of displays.

Peteanu has also investigated RNA splicing. Peteanu tracks RNA splicing using förster resonance energy transfer and total internal reflection fluorescence microscopy. She also studies energy transfer in DNA-based dye arrays, looking to understand and exploit the energy-transfer properties of multi-chromophore systems. In 2017, Peteanu was appointed head of the department of chemistry.

== Selected publications ==
- Wang Q; Schoenlein RW; Peteanu LA; Mathies RA; Shank CV (1 October 1994). "Vibrationally coherent photochemistry in the femtosecond primary event of vision". Science. 266 (5184): 422–424. Bibcode:1994Sci...266..422W. doi:10.1126/science.7939680. ISSN 0036-8075. PMID 7939680. Wikidata Q46070124.
- Hyung-Il Lee; Wei Wu; Jung Kwon Oh; Laura Mueller; Gizelle Sherwood; Linda Peteanu; Tomasz Kowalewski; Krzysztof Matyjaszewski (1 January 2007). "Light-induced reversible formation of polymeric micelles". Angewandte Chemie International Edition. 46 (14): 2453–2457. doi:10.1002/anie.200604278. ISSN 1433-7851. PMID 17310482. Wikidata Q51063595.
- L A Peteanu; R W Schoenlein; Q Wang; R A Mathies; C V Shank (1 December 1993). "The first step in vision occurs in femtoseconds: complete blue and red spectral studies". Proceedings of the National Academy of Sciences of the United States of America. 90 (24): 11762–11766. Bibcode:1993PNAS...9011762P. doi:10.1073/pnas.90.24.11762. ISSN 0027-8424. PMC 48064. PMID 8265623. Wikidata Q36725017.
