= Walter Gordy =

American chemist (1909–1985)

- Born: April 20, 1909; Newton County, Mississippi, United States
- Died: October 6, 1985 (aged 76)
- Education: Mississippi College
- Known for: Microwave spectroscopy
- Awards: Earle K. Plyler Prize for Molecular Spectroscopy, Jesse Beams Award
- Scientific career
- Fields: Physical chemist
- Workplaces: Mary Hardin-Baylor College, California Institute of Technology, MIT Radiation Laboratory, Duke University
- Doctoral advisor: Earle K. Plyler

Walter Gordy (April 20, 1909 – October 6, 1985) was an American physicist best known for his experimental work in microwave spectroscopy. His laboratory at Duke University became a center for research in this field, and he authored one of the definitive books on the field.

== Career ==
Gordy began college at Clarke Memorial Junior College in 1929. He enrolled in Mississippi College in 1930 and completed his bachelor's degree in 1932. He then began graduate work at the University of North Carolina where he received a M.A. in 1933 and a Ph.D. in 1935. Gordy's doctoral research in infrared spectroscopy was carried out under Earle K. Plyler.

From 1935 to 1941 Gordy taught at Mary Hardin-Baylor College where he was an associate professor of physics and mathematics. During this time he pursued his research interests, spectroscopic studies of hydrogen bonding, through summer research work at the University of North Carolina and Ohio State University. In 1941, Gordy was awarded a National Research Fellowship for this work. He used the fellowship to move to the California Institute of Technology and work with Linus Pauling. The advent of World War II cut this fellowship short. In 1942 Gordy joined the MIT Radiation Laboratory where he worked on the development of microwave radar. Gordy's work with microwave technology during this time led him to focus his subsequent spectroscopic research efforts on microwave spectroscopy. He joined the physics department at Duke University in 1946 and established a research group centered on microwave and millimeter-wave spectroscopy. He achieved the university's highest rank, James B. Duke Professor, in 1958 and continued at Duke until his retirement in 1979.

== Books and publications ==
=== Theses ===
- Gordy, Walter (1933). The effect of an electric field on the infrared absorption of molecules. OCLC 39100788.
- Gordy, Walter (1935). The infrared absorption of solutions of hydroxides and hydrolyzing salts. OCLC 39100789.

=== Journal articles ===
- Gordy, Walter; Stanford, Spencer C. (1940). "Spectroscopic Evidence for Hydrogen Bonds: SH, NH and NH2 Compounds". Journal of the American Chemical Society. 62 (3): 497. doi:10.1021/ja01860a011.

=== Books ===
- Gordy, Walter (1980). Theory and Applications of Electron Spin Resonance. New York, New York: Wiley. ISBN 9780471931621. OCLC 4857854.
- Gordy, Walter; Cook, Robert L. (1984). Microwave Molecular Spectra. Wiley. ISBN 9780471086819. OCLC 70849404.
- Gordy, Walter; Smith, William V.; Trambarulo, Ralph F. (1953). Microwave Spectroscopy. New York, New York: Wiley. OCLC 1302419.
