= Wixon =

Wixon may refer to:

== People ==
- David Wixon Pratt, American physicist
- Richard Wixon (born 1957), New Zealand cricketer
- Susan H. Wixon (1839-1912), American writer, editor, feminist, and educator

== Places ==
- Wixon Valley, Texas, city in Brazos County, Texas
