= Mitsuo Tasumi =

Japanese chemist (1937–2021)

- Born: January 23, 1937; Nishinomiya, Japan
- Died: November 24, 2021 (aged 84); Tokyo, Japan
- Education: University of Tokyo
- Known for: Phonon dispersion of polyethylene. Professor, University of Tokyo; President, Saitama University
- Awards: Order of the Sacred Treasure (Japan); Purple Ribbon Medal (Japan); Ellis R. Lippincott Award of Optical Society of America; Prize of the Chemical Society of Japan
- Scientific career
- Fields: Chemistry
- Workplaces: University of Tokyo; Saitama University; University of Michigan; Polytechnic University of Milan; University of California, Berkeley
- Doctoral advisor: Takehiko Shimanouchi

Mitsuo Tasumi (January 23, 1937 – November 24, 2021) was a Japanese physical chemist known for his vibrational spectroscopic works on synthetic and biological macromolecules. He was Professor Emeritus of the University of Tokyo, and a former president of Saitama University, having trained a number of physical chemists active in academia and industry. Moto-o Tasumi, a zoologist at Kyoto University, was his brother.

== Career ==
Tasumi earned his B.Sc. (1959), M.Sc. (1961) and Ph.D. (1964) from the University of Tokyo in the laboratories of San-Ichiro Mizushima and of Takehiko Shimanouchi, where he reported the first phonon dispersion of polyethylene. He spent the subsequent 33 years (1964–97) as a faculty member initially in the Department of Biochemistry and then in the Department of Chemistry of the University of Tokyo. During this period, he spent a year (1965–66) at University of Michigan as a Fulbright scholar in the laboratory of Samuel Krimm and another year (1966–67) at Polytechnic University of Milan as a postdoctoral scholar in the laboratory of Giuseppe Zerbi under Giulio Natta, a Nobel laureate.

At the University of Tokyo, Tasumi led a large group of spectroscopists, developing new experimental and computational techniques of infrared spectroscopy and Raman scattering spectroscopy. He is known for establishing the theoretical basis for interpreting the spectra of synthetic polymers (including electrical conductive polymers), proteins, and photosynthetic systems to elucidate their relationship with the structural, thermal, mechanical, transport, and response properties. He published several papers with Hideki Shirakawa, who was awarded a Nobel Prize jointly with Alan MacDiarmid and Alan Heeger. He was among the earliest spectroscopists who saw the great utility of ab initio electronic structure calculations in understanding vibrational spectra. In particular, he established a steady-state spectroscopic method that can determine the structures and dynamics of electronic excited states by resonance Raman excitation profile, and applied it to polyenes including carotenoids. At the same time, he made important contributions to the development and applications of time-resolved vibrational spectroscopies. He is a co-author of the Protein Data Bank and the editor/author of "Introduction to Experimental Infrared Spectroscopy: Fundamentals and Practical Methods."

In 2004–08, Tasumi was the President of Saitama University after serving as Professor of Chemistry (1996-2002) of Saitama University and as Visiting Professor (2002–03) at University of California, Berkeley (stayed at the laboratory of Herbert Strauss).

In 1987–89, Tasumi was a member of the Board of Directors of the Chemical Society of Japan. In 1994–2000, he was an Executive Committee Member of CODATA. In 1997–99, he was the president of the Spectroscopical Society of Japan.

Tasumi died on November 23, 2021, at the age of 84.

== Honors and awards ==
- Prize of the Society of Polymer Science, Japan (1971)
- Prize of the Chemical Society of Japan (1994)
- Prize of the Spectroscopical Society of Japan (1997)
- The Ellis R. Lippincott Award from the Optical Society of America, Society for Applied Spectroscopy, and Coblentz Society (1999)
- The Purple Ribbon Medal from the Japanese Government (1999)
- The inaugural TRVS Award from the International Conference on Time-Resolved Vibrational Spectroscopy (1999)
- Fellow of the Optical Society of America (2000)
- Honorary Membership Award from the Society for Applied Spectroscopy (2004)
- Fellow of the Society for Applied Spectroscopy (2004)
- Honorary Member of the Spectroscopical Society of Japan (2007)
- Honorary Member of the Japan Society for Molecular Science (2015)
- Honorary Member of the Protein Science Society of Japan (2016)
- Order of the Sacred Treasure from the Japanese Government (2017)
