= Tony Dean =

Tony Dean may refer to:

- Tony Dean (conservationist) (1940–2008), American outdoors broadcaster, activist and conservationist
- Tony Dean (Canadian politician) (born 1953), Canadian Senator and former Ontario civil servant
- Tony Dean (Australian politician) (born 1954), Australian politician
- Tony Dean (rugby league) (1949–2014), English rugby league footballer who played in the 1960s, 1970s and 1980s, and coached in the 1980s
- Tony Dean (racing driver) (1932–2008), British former racing driver
- Anthony Dean (cyclist) (born 1991), Australian Olympic BMX racer
- Anthony M. Dean, American engineer

== See also ==
- Anthony Deane (disambiguation)
