= Marjatta Lyyra =

Finnish-American physicist

A. Marjatta Lyyra is a Finnish and American physicist whose research has involved the development of triple-resonance nuclear magnetic resonance spectroscopy and its applications in molecular quantum optics, including electromagnetically induced transparency. She is a professor of physics at Temple University.

== Early life, education, and career ==
Lyyra grew up in Finland in a family with five brothers. Deterred by allergy from a childhood interest in veterinary science, she turned to her second-favorite discipline, physics. She became a student at the University of Helsinki in Finland, where she received a bachelor's degree in 1971 and a master's degree in 1973.

She completed her Ph.D. at Stockholm University in Sweden in 1979, also earning a license for deep-sea sailing in her time in Sweden. Her doctoral dissertation, Molecular spectroscopy, was supervised by Philip Bunker.

She worked as a research scientist at the University of Iowa, where she helped pioneer triple-resonance spectroscopy with William Stwalley and Paul Kleiber, before joining the Temple University faculty.

== Recognition ==
Lyyra was elected as a Fellow of the American Physical Society (APS) in 2005, after a nomination from the APS Division of Laser Science, "for the development of multi-resonance laser spectroscopic technique for facilitating large inter-nuclear distance molecular excitation with state selectivity and for probing coherence effects in molecular systems". In 2019, Optica named her as a fellow, "for significant contributions and leadership in experimental research in all-optical triple resonance spectroscopy and its application to frequency domain control of quantum state singlet/triplet character and all-optical spin switching".
