= David Keith (physicist) =

American physicist

Professor David Keith
- Citizenship: Canada, United States, and United Kingdom
- Education: University of Toronto (1986), MIT (1991)
- Scientific career
- Fields: Applied physics, energy and climate
- Workplaces: Carnegie Mellon University, University of Calgary, Harvard University, University of Chicago
- Website: keith.seas.harvard.edu

External videos
- "Can We Cool the Planet?", Nova, October 28, 2020
- "Solar Geoengineering: Public Policy and Geopolitical Considerations", talk to the IIEA, September 25, 2019
- "As planet warms, scientists explore 'far out' ways to reduce atmospheric CO2" on YouTube, PBS NewsHour March 27, 2019 (with animation of SCoPEx)
- "Patient Geoengineering", talk to the Long Now Foundation, May 10, 2020

David W. Keith is a professor in the Department of the Geophysical Sciences at the University of Chicago. He joined the University of Chicago in April 2023. Keith previously served as the Gordon McKay Professor of Applied Physics for Harvard University's Paulson School of Engineering and Applied Sciences (SEAS) and professor of public policy for the Harvard Kennedy School at Harvard University. Early contributions include development of the first atom interferometer (considered a major breakthrough in atomic physics) and a Fourier-transform spectrometer used by NASA to measure atmospheric temperature and radiation transfer from space.

A specialist on energy technology, climate science, and related public policy, and a pioneer in carbon capture and storage, Keith was a founder and board member of Carbon Engineering, it was sold to Occidental in 2023, at which point he was not a board member and had 4% ownership of the company.

Keith's research spans multiple fields, including climate-related technology assessment and policy analysis, technology development, atmospheric sciences, and physics. He strongly advocates for research into geoengineering approaches for addressing climate change, including both carbon cycle engineering and solar radiation management approaches. He emphasizes that their scientific, environmental, geopolitical, social, psychological and ethical implications all need to be carefully examined and understood, before there can be a meaningful consideration of their possible use.

== Personal life ==
Keith was born in Wisconsin, where his father, a British-born field biologist and Canadian Wildlife Service civil servant named Anthony Keith, attended grad school. His mother, Deborah Gorham, was a history professor at Carleton University. Keith grew up in Great Britain and in Ottawa, Ontario. His stepmother was a biologist, like his father. Keith is a citizen of Canada, the United States, and the United Kingdom.

He enjoyed reading and birdwatching with his father and later took up cross-country skiing, rock climbing and winter camping. Keith's interest in physics was strengthened by spending several summers working in the National Research Council laser lab of experimental physicist Paul Corkum, beginning around the end of high school. In 1986 Keith graduated with a B.S. in physics from the University of Toronto.

He developed a love of the Arctic when he spent part of a gap year between undergraduate and graduate studies as a wildlife biologist's research assistant on Devon Island in Nunavut. Since then he has canoed on the Yellowknife River, hiked Holman Island and crossed rough sea ice from Iglulik to Arctic Bay on skis.

== Academic career ==
In 1991, Keith earned his doctorate from the Massachusetts Institute of Technology in the field of Experimental Physics. As a doctoral student at MIT, Keith was supervised by David E. Pritchard. Keith was a leader in the research group that created the first working atom interferometer, considered a major breakthrough in atomic physics. This work was the basis for his Ph.D. thesis, An Interferometer for Atoms (1991). After achieving this success, Keith chose to leave atomic physics, in part because one of the most obvious applications for atom interferometry was in building highly accurate gyroscopes for submarines carrying ballistic missiles.

Keith was a post-doctoral fellow at Carnegie Mellon University from 1991 to 1992, working with Granger Morgan to better understand uncertainty and expert judgments relating to climate change. Keith became an adjunct assistant professor there in 1992, though working primarily elsewhere. He received a National Oceanic and Atmospheric Administration (NOAA) Global Change Fellowship for 1992–1994, which he used to work on climate modeling at the National Center for Atmospheric Research (NCAR) in Boulder, Colorado.

Keith spent the final year of his NOAA postdoc as a research scientist in the Department of Earth and Planetary Sciences at Harvard University where he remained from 1993 to 1999. He worked with atmospheric chemist James G. Anderson. Keith was the lead scientist in developing a Fourier-transform spectrometer with high radiometric accuracy which was used by NASA's high-altitude ER-2 research aircraft and by the Arrhenius satellite. Keith's sensors supported the measurement of atmospheric temperature and radiation transfer from space.

As of 1999, Keith became an assistant professor at the Department of Engineering and Public Policy at Carnegie Mellon University. By 2000, Keith and Ph.D. student James Rhodes were developing a framework for what would be called bioenergy with carbon capture and storage (BECCS). From the beginning, Keith has pointed out both advantages and concerns about possible approaches to climate mitigation.

In 2004, Keith was recruited to join the University of Calgary, where he became a professor of chemical and petroleum engineering and economics, and held the Canada Research Chair in Energy and the Environment. Keith became the director of the Institute for Sustainable Energy, Environment and Economy (ISEEE)'s Energy and Environmental Systems Group at the University of Calgary, an interdisciplinary research group within ISEEE. While at the University of Calgary, he remained an adjunct professor at Carnegie Mellon. At ISEEE, Keith sought to build connections between government, academics, environmentalists and business people. He gained the support of four major energy sector executives, publishing a 2007 report promoting carbon capture and storage.

Keith later felt that the intellectual integrity of the organization became compromised. Effective September 1, 2011, Keith resigned from the University of Calgary. He remained an adjunct professor in the Physics and Astronomy Department at the University of Calgary, and a visiting fellow at ISEEE.

Also as of 2011, Keith accepted a professorship in applied physics and public policy at the Kennedy School of Harvard University. In 2017 Keith was a founding co-director, with climate economist Gernot Wagner, of Harvard's Solar Geoengineering Research Program. As of 2019, Keith became the sole director, after Wagner joined the faculty of New York University.

Keith presented to US National Academy of Sciences meetings in 2000, 2009 and 2013.

Keith moved his research to the University of Chicago in 2023, where he will lead a program with up to ten faculty members studying geoengineering.

== Public policy ==
Keith was a coauthor of the 2001 IPCC Third Assessment Report (chapters AR3-WG1, 8 Model Evaluation; AR3-WG3, 4 Technological and Economic Potential of Options to Enhance, Maintain, and Manage Biological Carbon Reservoirs and Geo-engineering). Keith also chaired one of three groups for the United Nations' Intergovernmental Panel on Climate Change (IPCC) and was a lead author of the 2005 IPCC Special Report on Carbon Dioxide Capture and Storage. He resigned from the committee for the IPCC Fifth Assessment Report.

In May 2005 Keith was appointed to a federal advisory panel for the Canadian government's Sustainable Energy Science and Technology Strategy. Keith was a member of the Geoengineering the climate: science, governance and uncertainty working group of the UK Royal Society, which produced a 2009 report. In 2010, Keith testified before committees of the US Congress and the UK Parliament.

With Ken Caldeira, Keith has managed the Fund for Innovative Energy and Climate Research (FICER), established by Bill Gates for climate-change research.

Keith was one of 18 members of the Washington, D.C. Bipartisan Policy Center (BPC)'s Task Force on Climate Remediation, which released a research report on October 4, 2011. The authors of the BPC report believe "the (US) federal government should embark on a focused and systematic program of research into climate remediation." As of 2021, the National Academies issued a report on the same subject, supporting a robust research plan and substantial oversight, risk assessment, and public outreach efforts and describing a framework for governance of possible experiments. Keith sees its governance recommendations as "actionable, incremental, and well-reasoned".

== Scientific work ==
Keith has written about the possible cost-effectiveness and geopolitical and ethical implications of many approaches to climate change and climate mitigation. In 2003, he and Alexander Farrell published a commentary in Science, questioning government initiatives for the development of fuel cell vehicles using compressed hydrogen. Hydrogen tends to be derived from oil and coal, and produces carbon dioxide. In 2004, the National Academy of Sciences published a controversial paper in which his computer models suggested that massive wind farms turbines might have unexpected local and global impacts on climate. His argument was not that wind energy should not be considered, but rather that it needed to be better understood. After early skepticism in 2008-2011 about solar energy's potential to become competitive, he now sees solar power as a leading contender for providing energy without huge environmental impact.

=== Carbon engineering ===
In the 1990s and 2000s, Keith worked on CO_{2} capture and storage, considering it in terms of technology, economics and regulatory policy in the energy industry. Keith emphasizes that the primary goal in combating climate change must be the reduction of carbon emissions. However, it will still be necessary to counteract the effects of the carbon dioxide that has already been released into the atmosphere. He therefore sees multiple approaches to the problem of climate change, including pollution-management techniques and a "carbon tax", as desirable. He has been criticized by environmental groups, politicians and energy-related business people for different recommendations.

As of 2005, Keith's team at the University of Calgary built a five-metre tower to test the feasibility of removing "scrubbing" CO_{2} from the air and storing it underground. In 2009 Keith founded Carbon Engineering, which seeks to develop technologies for the removal of carbon dioxide from the air and its conversion into pure CO_{2}. Having created the company, he largely ceased to do research and policy analysis in that area, feeling it would be a conflict of interest.

As of October 2015, Carbon Engineering opened a demonstration plant for direct-air CO_{2} capture, in Squamish, British Columbia. The company hopes to use the carbon dioxide extracted from the air to produce an energy-dense synthetic carbon-based fuel, suitable for semis, buses and aircraft. Ideally they would like to produce a fuel that is economical, carbon-based and carbon-neutral. Financial backers of Carbon Engineering include Bill Gates, N. Murray Edwards, Peter J. Thomson, Chevron Corporation, Occidental Petroleum, and mining conglomerate BHP. Occidental purchased the company in 2023 for $1.1 billion; Keith held about four percent ownership prior to the sale.

=== Solar geoengineering ===
Keith has worked on solar geoengineering since 1992, when he and Hadi Dowlatabadi published one of the first assessments of the technology and its policy implications, introducing a structured comparison of cost and risk. Keith has consistently argued that geoengineering needs a "systematic research program" to determine whether or not its approaches are feasible. Keith has also appealed for international standards of governance and oversight for how such research might proceed.

Keith published another overview of geoengineering in 2000, describing it in terms of moral hazard and setting geoengineering in the context of the post-war history of weather control. At the time geoengineering was "deeply controversial" and rarely talked about. Since then, interest in the field has increased and it is more openly discussed.

Related publications include:

- in 2010 a method to reduce the amount of sulfur needed for a given radiative forcing;
- in 2010 a proposal for self-levitating photophoretic particles that might limit ozone loss;
- in 2011 he co-authored the first large-scale survey of public perception as to geoengineering;
- in 2012 the first quantitative analysis of "regional inequality" of "solar radiation management";
- he supervised the first economics Ph.D. to focus on geoengineering, and together with his student Moreno-Cruz in 2012 published an economic analysis of "optimal" decisions under result uncertainty.
- in 2013 he proposed a two-threshold system that combines "deployment moratoria" with a pathway for regulating "small-scale" (sic) research;

==== A Case for Climate Engineering ====
In 2013, Keith published A Case for Climate Engineering, providing "a clear and accessible overview" to a "controversial technology". The book is described as a useful entry point for discussions, particularly for stratospheric aerosol injection and less so for other approaches to geoengineering. "The book's arguments are clear and it is upfront about many of the problems that arise from the position it defends." Another reviewer appreciated Keith's ability to discuss issues "in simple language that can be understood by any reader" and his objectivity as he "discusses his own internal dilemma" and "exposes the reader to opposing views".

A leading scientist long concerned about climate change, Keith offers no naïve proposal for an easy fix to what is perhaps the most challenging question of our time; climate engineering is no silver bullet. But he argues that after decades during which very little progress has been made in reducing carbon emissions we must put this technology on the table and consider it responsibly.

The book garnered the attention of Stephen Colbert, and Keith appeared in a 9 December 2013 segment on The Colbert Report to discuss his geoengineering idea to slow climate change by spraying reflective particles into the upper atmosphere. Keith described the possibility of deploying planes to release tons of sulfuric acid into the atmosphere, which he freely admitted "would be a totally imperfect technical fix .. But it might actually save people and be useful." Colbert was skeptical. Critics of the idea also include University of Chicago geophysicist Raymond Pierrehumbert who termed the idea "wildly, utterly, howlingly barking mad", and the USA Today editorial board.

==== SCoPEx ====
Keith has worked initially with atmospheric chemist James G. Anderson and later with principal investigator Frank Keutsch in the "sun-dimming" project SCoPEx, to examine the potential of seeding the stratosphere with reflective particles that would direct sunlight away from the earth. The idea was inspired by natural events such as the volcanic eruption of Mount Pinatubo, which released sulfur and other particles into the air and caused a decrease in temperatures worldwide.

Computer models suggest that a particle dispersion approach could reduce solar wattage and ambient temperatures. Types of particles that have been proposed include sulfur dioxide, diamond dust, alumina and calcite or other forms of calcium carbonate. Major concerns for such an approach include the questions of how long particles would remain in the stratosphere, how they might interact with other components of the atmosphere, and whether they would increase pollution, cause health risks for humans, or have other negative ecological effects.

An early step in the project would be a small test using a balloon to release a small amount -- perhaps a kilogram -- of a chemical in the stratosphere. By studying local effects scientists could gain a better understanding of how the particles and the stratosphere would behave, to better assess the idea's feasibility and risks. Sensors attached to the balloon's gondola could measure particle reflectivity, degree of dispersion or coalescence of the plume, and interactions with other components of the atmosphere. If carried out, it would be one of the first official geoengineering-related experiments to be conducted outside of the laboratory.

A 2012 proposal to carry out such a test in New Mexico, releasing sulphates in the lower stratosphere, was withdrawn. In 2020, the location of another proposed test, using calcium carbonate, was shifted from the U.S. southwest to Sweden, near the Arctic Circle. In February 2021, plans to launch a stratospheric seeder balloon from Kiruna's Esrange Space Center in Lapland ran into opposition from the Swedes who wrote a heated letter to Per Bolund, the Swedish minister for environment and the Swedish Space Corporation (SSC). The latter said "The flight will only be conducted provided that it is compliant with national and international regulations. The process to find out if this flight is legally compliant and ethically appropriate is ongoing. As of today we don't know whether there will be a flight or not." On 31 March 2021, the SSC "said it had decided not to conduct the technical test" in the face of opposition from the local Sami reindeer herders and other environmental groups such as the Swedish Society for Nature Conservation, who thought the techniques "too dangerous to ever be used".

== Awards ==
- 2024, Australian Institute of Botanical Science Eureka Prize for Excellence in Botanical Science
- 2012, Queen Elizabeth II Diamond Jubilee Medal
- 2009, Time magazine, Hero of the Environment
- 2008, City of Calgary Award for Environmental Achievement by an Individual
- 2006, inaugural Royal Canadian Geographical Society Society Environmental Scientist of the Year

== Media ==
Keith is a frequent speaker and presenter. Among others, he has shared his thoughts in the TED forum in 2007, was featured on the Discovery Channel in 2008, participated in a panel on 21st-century challenges at the Royal Geographical Society in 2009, did an interview on BBC News HARDTalk in 2011, and appeared in a Nova documentary on geoengineering which aired 28 October 2020.

Professor Keith was the central focus of the Mangrove Media documentary film Plan C for Civilization, which premiered at the 2025 Doc NYC.
