= Jon T. Hougen =

American spectroscopist (1936–2019)

Jon Torger Hougen (23 October 1936 in Sheboygan – 28 January 2019 in Taipei) was an American spectroscopist.

== Education and career ==
Hougen finished his undergraduate degree at the University of Wisconsin in 1956. He obtained his master's and doctoral degrees at Harvard University. He worked at Harvard under the research direction of William Moffitt and William Klemperer. He started his career in 1960 as a postdoctorate fellow at the National Research Council of Canada in the molecular spectroscopy group of Gerhard Herzberg. He joined the staff at NRC in 1962 and supervised postdoctorate fellows J.K.G.Watson and Philip Bunker. In 1967 he joined the National Bureau of Standards (now the National Institute of Standards and Technology, or NIST). He started there as a member of D.R. Lide's microwave and infrared group. Later, he was the chief of the molecular spectroscopy section. In 1984, he was named a Senior Research Fellow of NIST. For a year, he served as acting chief of the molecular physics division. After retiring in 2001, he continued his research as a NIST Scientist Emeritus.

== Research ==
His research focused on quantum mechanical and group theoretical calculations of quantities related to molecular spectroscopy.

Three of his most-cited publications are:

- Hougen, Jon T. (15 January 1962). "Rotational Energy Levels of a Linear Triatomic Molecule in a Π Electronic State". The Journal of Chemical Physics. 36 (2): 519–534. Bibcode:1962JChPh..36..519H. doi:10.1063/1.1732544.
- Hougen, J.T.; Bunker, P.R.; Johns, J.W.C. (April 1970). "The vibration-rotation problem in triatomic molecules allowing for a large-amplitude bending vibration". Journal of Molecular Spectroscopy. 34 (1): 136–172. Bibcode:1970JMoSp..34..136H. doi:10.1016/0022-2852(70)90080-9. This paper introduced a Hamiltonian that has come to be called the Hougen-Bunker-Johns (HBJ) Hamiltonian.
- Hougen, Jon T. (October 1962). "Classification of Rotational Energy Levels for Symmetric‐Top Molecules". The Journal of Chemical Physics. 37 (7): 1433–1441. Bibcode:1962JChPh..37.1433H. doi:10.1063/1.1733301.

== Hobbies ==
He spoke several languages: French, French-Canadian, German, Czech, Japanese, and Mandarin in addition to English.

== Awards and honors ==
Hougen was elected a Fellow of the American Physical Society in 1979. In addition, Hougen received the following awards:

- Coblentz Award (1968)
- NBS Silver Medal (1974)
- NBS Gold Medal (1980)
- Ellis R. Lippincott Award (1984)
- Earle K. Plyler Prize for Molecular Spectroscopy (1984)
- Marcus Marci Award from the Czech Spectroscopy Society (1990)

The Journal of Molecular Spectroscopy dedicated two special issues to him in honor of his 68th and 80th birthday.

Two awards were created in his memory: the Jon Hougen Travel Award for the 26th Colloquium on High-Resolution Molecular Spectroscopy (2019) and the Jon Hougen Memorial Award, awarded annually at the International Symposium on Molecular Spectroscopy (2020-present).
