= Roberto Merlin =

Argentine physicist

Roberto D. Merlin is an Argentine physicist and Peter A. Franken Collegiate Professor of Physics and Professor of Electrical Engineering and Computer Science at the University of Michigan. He is known, among other things, for his work on quasiperiodic superlattices, squeezed phonons, and, most recently, for the discovery of "superfocusing", a method for creating lenses that can surpass the diffraction limit without using negative refraction materials.

Roberto Merlin was born in Buenos Aires, Argentina. He received his master's degree from the University of Buenos Aires in 1973 and his doctorate from the University of Stuttgart in 1978. His graduate advisor was Professor Manuel Cardona. After a postdoctoral position in the group of Professor Miles V. Klein at the University of Illinois at Urbana-Champaign, he joined the Physics faculty of the University of Michigan in 1980.

In 1985, he was promoted to associate professor, and then professor in 1989. From 1993 to 1996, Merlin served as Associate Chair for Research and Facilities of the Department of Physics. In 2000, he received a joint appointment to the Department of Electrical Engineering and Computer Science. He is now the director of the Optical Physics Interdisciplinary Laboratory.

Merlin is a fellow of the American Physical Society, the Optical Society of America, the von Humboldt Foundation, and the John Simon Guggenheim Memorial Foundation. In 2006, he received the Frank Isakson Prize for Optical Effects in Solids from the American Physical Society. He received the Ellis R. Lippincott Award in 2017.

Merlin does a variety of interdisciplinary work, mostly related to condensed matter physics. He has done research on Raman spectroscopy, rare-earth magnet semiconductors, superconductors, superlattices, ultrafast lasers, intercalated graphite, and negative refraction.

== Selected publications ==
- Merlin, R.; Bajema, K.; Clarke, R.; Juang, F.-Y.; Bhattacharya, P. K. (1985). "Quasiperiodic GaAs-AlAs heterostructures". Physical Review Letters. 55 (17): 1768–1770. Bibcode:1985PhRvL..55.1768M. doi:10.1103/PhysRevLett.55.1768. PMID 10031918.
- Merlin, R. (2007). "Radiationless electromagnetic interference: Evanescent-field lenses and perfect focusing". Science. 317 (5840): 927–929. Bibcode:2007Sci...317..927M. doi:10.1126/science.1143884. PMID 17626847. S2CID 22920108.
