= C. Bradley Moore =

American chemist

- Born: Charles Bradley Moore; December 7, 1939 (age 86); Boston, Massachusetts, U.S.
- Education: Harvard University (BA); University of California, Berkeley (PhD)
- Spouse: Penny Percival Moore
- Awards: Coblentz Award, Coblentz Society (1973); Ernest Orlando Lawrence Award (1986); elected member of the National Academy of Sciences (1986); Ellis R. Lippincott Award, Optical Society of America (1987); Earle K. Plyler Prize for Molecular Spectroscopy, American Physical Society(1994)
- Scientific career
- Fields: Physical chemistry
- Institutions: University of California, Berkeley, Lawrence Berkeley National Laboratory, Ohio State University, Northwestern University
- Doctoral advisor: George Pimentel
- Doctoral students: Hai-Lung Dai
- Other notable students: William H. Green; Paul Houston (postdoctoral student); Stephen Leone; Edward Yeung
- Website: chemistry.berkeley.edu/faculty/chem/emeriti/moore

Charles Bradley Moore (born December 7, 1939) is an American chemist and research administrator. His research focused on the application of lasers to understand the behavior and reaction dynamics of energized molecules and energy transfer between molecules. He is currently professor emeritus of chemistry at the University of California, Berkeley, where he had a long career as a faculty member actively engaged in research (1963–2000). While at UC Berkeley, Moore also served in several administrative roles, including chair of the department of chemistry (1982–1986), dean of the college of chemistry (1988–1994), and director of the chemical sciences division at the Lawrence Berkeley National Laboratory (1998–2000). He was vice president for research at Ohio State University (2000–2003) and held the same position at Northwestern University (2004–2008). He is also professor emeritus at Northwestern. Moore is a member of the National Academy of Sciences.

== Early life and education ==
Brad Moore was born in Boston on December 7, 1939, and raised in Pennsylvania. He attended Phillips Exeter Academy in New Hampshire for high school, and earned his AB at Harvard in 1960. He did his PhD thesis research at UC Berkeley under the supervision of George C. Pimentel, and joined the Berkeley faculty immediately after defending his thesis in 1963.

== Notable accomplishments ==
In the 1960s, Moore was one of the first chemists to utilize the newly invented laser in chemical research, later editing the five-volume series "Chemical and Biochemical Applications of Lasers". His group developed a method for isotopic enrichment using laser excitation. In the 1980s, his research group was the first to measure quantum state-resolved unimolecular reaction rates, and to see indications that reaction rates are quantized as suggested by RRKM theory. Attempts to explain his experimental observations motivated theoretical/computational advances, e.g. by his colleague William Hughes Miller and by Stephen Klippenstein. Moore also proposed the roaming radical mechanism to explain unexpected product formation in unimolecular decomposition reactions, and his experiments demonstrated that nuclear spin is conserved through chemical reactions.

Moore's research was well-respected by the physical chemistry community. Two chapters of the Annual Review of Physical Chemistry are devoted to reviewing his research. The Journal of Physical Chemistry A's Nov. 16, 2000 issue was a festschrift published in his honor, and the American Chemical Society held a special symposium in his honor at its National Meeting in August 2020. He was elected to the National Academy of Sciences in 1986, and to the American Academy of Arts and Sciences in 1996.

== Personal life ==
Brad Moore has been married to Penny Percival Moore, an educator, since 1960. They raised two children, now adults. Brad's father, Charles Walden Moore, worked for a time as a laboratory assistant to Thomas Edison.
