= Anthony Deane =

Anthony Deane may refer to:

- Sir Anthony Deane (shipwright) (1633–1721), politician and shipwright
- Anthony Deane (skeleton racer) (born 1984), Australian skeleton racer
- Anthony C. Deane (1870–1946), canon of Worcester Cathedral
- Anthony Deane-Drummond (1917–2012), British Army officer

== See also ==
- Anthony Dean (disambiguation)
