= Lucy Ziurys =

American astrochemist

Lucy Marie Ziurys (born May 6, 1957) is an American astrochemist known for her work on high-resolution molecular spectroscopy. She is Regent's Professor of Chemistry & Biology and of Astronomy at the University of Arizona.

== Contributions ==
Ziurys's work has discovered new molecules in interstellar space and in carbon-rich circumstellar envelopes, found unexpectedly long molecular lifetimes in planetary nebulae, and made pioneering high-resolution submillimeter astronomy observations of supermassive black holes using very-long-baseline interferometry. In earthbound experiments, she has also found models for the interstellar creation of buckminsterfullerene.

== Education and career ==
Ziurys is originally from Annapolis, Maryland. She majored in chemistry, chemical physics, and physics at Rice University, graduating summa cum laude in 1978. She went to the University of California, Berkeley for graduate study in physical chemistry, completing a Ph.D. in 1984 under the supervision of Richard J. Saykally.

After postdoctoral research University of Massachusetts Amherst, working in the Five College Radio Astronomy Observatory, she joined the Arizona State University Department of Chemistry in 1988. She moved to the University of Arizona in 1997. At the University of Arizona, she directed the Arizona Radio Observatory from 2000 to 2016. She was named Regent's Professor in 2019

== Recognition ==
In 2008, Ziurys was named a Fellow of the American Physical Society (APS), after a nomination from the APS Division of Atomic, Molecular & Optical Physics, "for forefront contributions in molecular spectroscopy leading to new discoveries and understanding of molecules in interstellar and circumstellar environments".

In 2015, Ziurys won the Barbara Mez-Starck Prize "for her microwave spectroscopic studies of transition metal compounds in high spin states as well as for her laboratory investigations with interplay with astrophysics, astrochemistry, and astrobiology". She was the 2019 winner of the Laboratory Astrophysics Prize, the highest honor of the Laboratory Astrophysics Division of the American Astronomical Society.

She was part of the Event Horizon Telescope team, which won the 2020 Breakthrough Prize in Fundamental Physics.
