= Frank Keutsch =

German-American chemist

Frank N. Keutsch (born 1971 in Tübingen) is a German-American chemist and a researcher on solar geoengineering. His research lies in atmospheric chemistry, including the photochemical oxidation of volatile organic compounds that lead to secondary organic aerosol formation. He leads the Stratospheric Controlled Perturbation Experiment (SCoPEx) project at Harvard University with members including David Keith.

== Education and career ==
Keutsch was born in Tübingen, Germany. He studied chemistry at the Technical University of Munich with a scholarship from the German National Academic Foundation, receiving a diploma with Vladimir E. Bondybey. After graduating in 1997, Keutsch moved to the University of California at Berkeley, where he received his Ph.D. in physical chemistry in 2001. His supervisor was Richard J. Saykally on high-resolution vibration-rotation-tunneling spectroscopy of water clusters. Keutsch then went to Harvard University as a postdoc, where he worked on stratospheric chemistry under the supervision of James G. Anderson. Keutsch began his independent academic career in 2005 as an assistant professor at the University of Wisconsin-Madison. He is currently the Stonington Professor in Engineering and Atmospheric Science at Harvard University.

== Honors and awards ==
Keutsch won the following awards,

- 2006 Camille and Henry Dreyfus Award Postdoctoral Program in Environmental Chemistry
- 2006 Favorite Instructor Fall 2006 from Ogg and Elizabeth Waters Halls
- 2005 Camille and Henry Dreyfus New Faculty Award
