= Hai-Lung Dai =

Taiwanese physical chemist

- 戴海龙
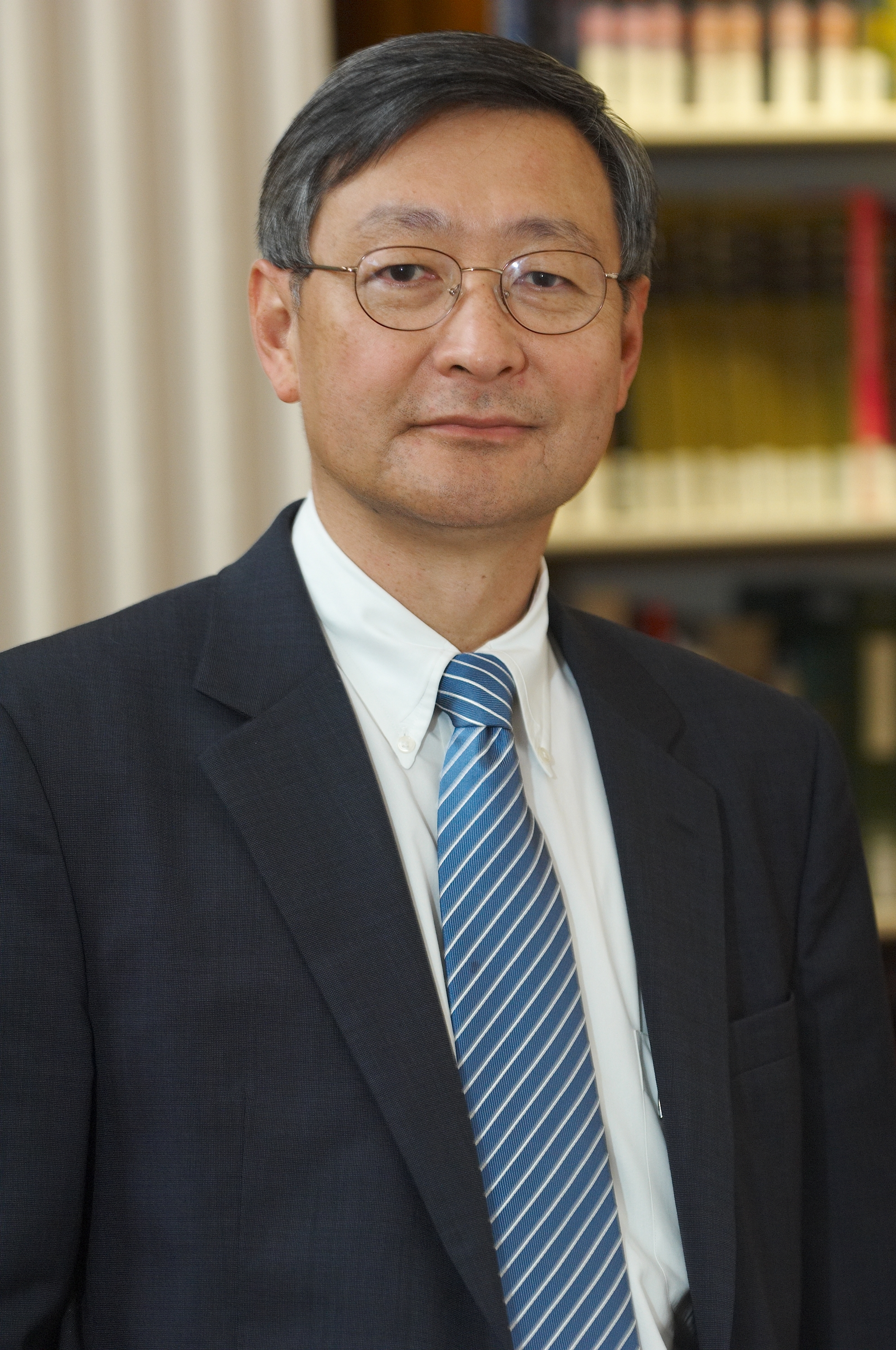
- Dai in 2007
- Born: Taiwan
- Education: National Taiwan University (BS); University of California, Berkeley (PhD)
- Title: Laura H. Carnell Professor of Chemistry
- Scientific career
- Fields: Physical chemistry
- Workplaces: University of Pennsylvania; Temple University
- Thesis: Multiphoton dissociation and thermal unimolecular reactions induced by infrared lasers (1981)
- Doctoral advisor: C. Bradley Moore

Hai-Lung Dai (Chinese: 戴海龙) is a Taiwanese physical chemist and academic. He is the Laura H. Carnell Professor of Chemistry at Temple University in Philadelphia, Pennsylvania.

== Early life and education ==
Dai was born in Taiwan to waishengren parents who fled mainland China during the Great Retreat. His mother was an elementary school teacher. He was raised in Zhonghe District in New Taipei and graduated from Taipei Municipal Chien Kuo High School.

After high school, Dai studied geology and chemistry at National Taiwan University and graduated with a Bachelor of Science (B.S.) in chemistry in 1974. Following military service, he went to the United States in 1976 for graduate studies. He obtained his doctorate in chemistry from the University of California at Berkeley in 1981.

== Academic career ==
After receiving his doctorate, Dai was a postdoctoral researcher at the Massachusetts Institute of Technology until 1984. That year he began teaching in the chemistry department of the University of Pennsylvania in Philadelphia, where he remained for twenty-two years and became department chair and the Hirschmann-Makineni Professor. He founded the Penn Science Teacher Institute that eventually trained 300 in-service science teachers and was named as a model for training science teachers in a 2005 National Academy of Sciences white paper. In 2007 he became Dean of the College of Science and Technology of Temple University, also in Philadelphia, Pennsylvania, and was Provost of Temple University during 2012 - 2016. During his time as provost, Temple's USNWR ranking went from #135 to #115 and Temple became a Carnegie R1 Highest Research Activity University. In 2017, Dai was appointed vice president for International Affairs at Temple University.

== Selected publications ==
- Hai-Lung Dai, Robert W. Field (editors) (1995). Molecular dynamics and spectroscopy by stimulated emission pumping. Singapore; New Jersey; London; Hong Kong: World Scientific. ISBN 9789810217495.
- Hai-Lung Dai, Wilson Ho (editors) (1995). Laser spectroscopy and photochemistry on metal surfaces. Singapore; New Jersey; London; Hong Kong: World Scientific. ISBN 9789810229986.

== Recognition ==
Dai has received several honors and awards, among them:

- 1985: Camille and Henry Dreyfus Foundation New Faculty Award
- 1988: Sloan Fellowship
- 1989: The Camille and Henry Dreyfus Foundation Teacher-Scholar Award
- 1990: Coblentz Award in Spectroscopy
- 1992: Fellowship of the American Physical Society
- 1994: Alexander von Humboldt Award for Senior US Scientists
- 1995: Philadelphia Section Award, American Chemical Society
- 2000: Guggenheim Fellowship
- 2006: Ellis Lippincott Award for Spectroscopy of the Optical Society of America
- 2009: Distinguished Achievement Award, the Institute of Chinese Engineers in the U.S.
- 2010: Fellowship of the American Chemical Society
- 2012: Langmuir Lecturer Award, Division of Colloid and Surface Chemistry, American Chemical Society
- 2013: Michael P. Malone International Leadership Award, Association of Public and Land Grant Universities
- 2017: Knight Order of the Italian Star, Government of Italy
- 2017: Distinguished Alumni Award, National Taiwan University
- 2019: Hai-Lung Dai Festschrift, Journal of Physical Chemistry, American Chemical Society
