= Steven G. Boxer =

American biophysical chemist

Steven G. Boxer is an American biophysical chemist. He is the Camille Dreyfus Professor at Stanford University, a member of the National Academy of Sciences, and an elected fellow of the American Association for the Advancement of Science, American Academy of Arts and Sciences, Royal Society of Chemistry and Biophysical Society. He received many awards, including the NIH MERIT Award and the Earle K. Plyler Prize for Molecular Spectroscopy.
