= Yukihiro Ozaki =

Japanese scientist

- Born: 19 October 1949 (age 76); Sakai, Osaka, Japan
- Education: Osaka University
- Scientific career
- Fields: Molecular Spectroscopy, Physical Chemistry, Analytical Chemistry
- Workplaces: Kwansei Gakuin University, The Jikei University of School of Medicine, National Research Council of Canada

Yukihiro Ozaki (尾崎 幸洋, Ozaki Yukihiro; born October 19, 1949) is a Japanese scientist. Kwansei Gakuin University, Department of Chemistry, School of Science and Technology, professor emeritus, Fellow.

He was born in Sakai, Osaka, Japan. In 1973, he had B.Sc. in Chemistry, Faculty of Science, Osaka University. In 1978, he had PhD in Physical and Inorganic Chemistry, Faculty of Science, Osaka University. He worked as a research associate (Fixed-term) in Division of Biological Sciences, National Research Council of Canada. In 1981, he became an instructor in Division of Biochemistry, Institute of Medical Science, The Jikei University School of Medicine, Tokyo, Japan and became an assistant professor there. From 1989 he started working as an associate professor in Department of Chemistry, School of Science, Kwansei Gakuin University, Nishinomiya, Japan. And he became a professor there in 1993. Because of the government reorganization, he became a professor in Department of Chemistry, School of Science and Technology, Kwansei Gakuin University from 2001. He was a dean of the School of Science and Technology, Kwansei Gakuin University from 2006 to 2010 and he was a vice president from 2013 to 2018. He was also the president of The Spectroscopical Society of Japan (SPSJ) from 2014 to 2016.

He is a researcher in molecular spectroscopy in condensed phase, physical chemistry and analytical chemistry. He investigates basic studies and application of various spectroscopies, IR, Raman, NIR, FUV, and FIR/terahertz spectroscopy. He has made many achievements in spectroscopy which would be a bridge between the basis and the application. Recently, he is very active in application of quantum chemistry to molecular spectroscopy, developing a strong bridge between them. From 1999 to 2017, for 19 years in a row, he published more than 30 papers in a year. As of December 2025, his h-index is 89, and he has published more than 1140 papers and has been cited more than 39,000 times in total.

== Awards ==
=== International awards ===
- Tomas Hirschfeld Award (1998), International Consortium for Near Infrared Spectroscopy
- EAS Award in Achievement in Near-Infrared Spectroscopy (2001), Eastern Analytical Symposium
- The Büchi NIR Award (2002), Büchi
- Gerald S. Birth Award (2006), The Council of Near Infrared Spectroscopy
- Dasari Lecture Award, George R. Harrison Spectroscopy Laboratory, MIT (2011)
- Bomem-Michelson Award (2014), The Coblentz Society
- China Friendship Award on Molecular Spectroscopy (2016), The Chinese Optical Society
- Pittsburgh Spectroscopy Award (2019), The Pittsburgh Spectroscopy Society
- Charles Mann Award of Applied Raman Spectroscopy (2020), FACSS, USA
- Karl Norris Award (2021), ICNRS（International Council of NIR Spectroscopy）
- Medal of Ioannes Marcus Marci (2022), Ioannes Marcus Marci Spectroscopic Society.
- Chinese Government Friendship Award (2022) (15) Dingxin (Innovation) Lecture Award, Jilin University, China (2023).
- Chemistry Department Innovation Lecture Award, University of Albany, USA (2023).
- Xing Da Lectureship Award, Peking University (2024).
- Ellis R. Lippincott Award, Optica, Society for Applied Spectroscopy, Coblentz Society (2025).

=== Domestic awards ===
- The Young Scientist Award (1987) by The Spectroscopical Society of Japan.
- The Spectroscopical Society of Japan Award (2002)
- Hyogo Prefecture Science Award (2003)
- Science and Technology Award of Ministry of Education, Culture, Sports, Science and Technology (2005)
- Japan Analytical Chemistry Society Award (2008)
- Japan Analytical Chemistry Society Advanced Analytical Technique Award (2011)
- The Chemical Society of Japan Award (2017)
- The Medal with Purple Ribbon (2018)

=== Distinctions and honors ===
- Honorary Professor; Jilin University, Changchun, China (2007-).
- Honorary Professor; Changchun Institute of Applied Chemistry, Changchun, China (2007-).
- Special Merits Award, Kazakh National Technical University, Kazakhstan (2007). (4) Guest Professor; Peking University, Peking, China (2009-).
- Gold Medal Award, University of Wroclaw, Poland (2009).
- Changbai Mountain Friendship Award, China (2010).
- Dr. Ramachandra Rao Dassari Distinguished Lecture (Indian Institute of Technology (IIT), Kanpur) (2012).
- Jagiellonian University 650th Anniversary PLUS RATIO VIS Silver Medal.
- Doctor Honoris Causa, Jagiellonian University, Poland (2016)
- Adjunct professor, Ewha Womans University, Korea (2016)
- Honorary professor, Amity University Uttar Pradesh, India (2017)
- Honoring Award; “90th Anniversary of the discovery of Raman Effect” (2017). Bangalore, India
- Doctor Honoris Causa, University of Wroclaw, Poland (2019)

=== Fellows ===
- Fellow, Society for Applied Spectroscopy (2010).
- Fellow Award (2015). The Royal Society of Chemistry
- Fellow Award (2016). The Chemical Society of Japan
- Fellowship Award (2017). International Council of Near- infrared Spectroscopy

== Publications ==
=== Books ===
- Y. Ozaki, I. Noda ed.: Two-Dimensional Correlation Spectroscopy, American Institute of Physics (2000)
- A. A. Christy, Y. Ozaki, and V. G. Gregoriou: Modern Fourier Transform Infrared Spectroscopy, Elsevier, Amsterdam (2001)
- H. W. Siesler, Y. Ozaki, S. Kawata, and H. M. Heise: Near-Infrared Spectroscopy, Principles, Instruments, Applications, Wiley-VCH, Weinheim, Germany (2002)
- I. Noda and Y. Ozaki: Two-Dimensional Correlation Spectroscopy, John-Wiley & Sons (2004)
- Y. Ozaki, W. F. McClure, and A. A. Christy: Near-Infrared Spectroscopy in Food Science and Technology, Wiley-Interscience, New York (2007)
- S. Sasic and Y. Ozaki ed.: Raman, Infrared, and Near-Infrared Chemical Imaging, John Wiley & Sons (2010)
- Y. Ozaki, K. Kneipp, and R. Aroca eds.: Frontiers of Surface-Enhanced Raman Scattering : Single Nanoparticles and Single Cells, Wiley (2014)
- Y. Ozaki and S. Kawata eds.: Far- and Deep-Ultraviolet Spectroscopy, Springer (2015)
- Y. Ozaki, G. Schatz, D. Graham, and T. Itoh, eds.: Frontiers of Plasmon Enhanced Spectroscopy, Vol. 1 & Vol. 2, ACS Symposium Series, American Chemical Society (2017)
- K. Kneipp, Y. Ozaki and Z.-Q. Tian, eds.: 45 years enhanced Raman signals - recent developments in plasmon supported Raman spectroscopy, World Scientific, in press (2017)
- M. Wojcik, B. Kirtman, H. Nakatsuji, Y. Ozaki, eds.: Frontiers of Quantum Chemistry, Springer (2017)
- H. Sato, J. Popp, B. Wood, Y. Ozaki, eds.: Raman Spectroscopy in Human Health and Biomedicine, World Scientific (2023)
- Y. Ozaki, C. Huck, S. Tsuchikawa, and S. B. Engelsen eds.: Near-Infrared Spectroscopy, Theory, Spectral Analysis, Instrumentation, and Applications, Springer (2020).
- Y. Ozaki and H. Sato eds.: Spectroscopic Techniques for Polymer Characterization., Wiley-VCH, ISBN 978-3-527-34833-6 (2021).
- M. J. Wojcik and Y. Ozaki eds.: Spectroscopy and Computatio of Hydrogen-Bonded Systems, Wiley-VCH (2023).
- M. Prochazka, J. Kneipp, B, Zhao, and Y. Ozaki, eds.: Surface- and Tip-enhanced Raman Scattring Specroscopy, Springer (2024).

== Links ==
- KAKEN - 尾崎 幸洋(00147290)
