= Andreas Albrecht (mathematician) =

German mathematician (1586–1628)

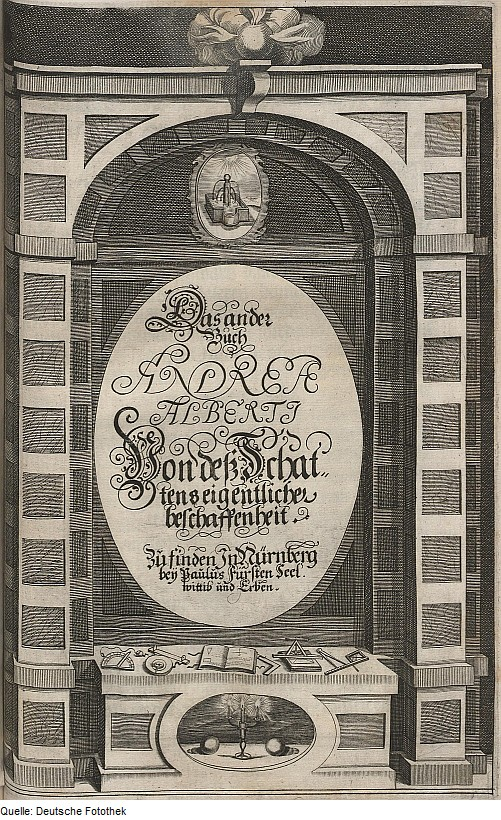
Zwey Bücher: Das erste von der Ohne und durch die Arithmetica gefundenen Perspectiva, Das andere von dem dazu gehörigen Schatten. (Two books: the first of the Perspectiva ... the other of the corresponding shadow)

Andreas Albrecht (Nuremberg 1586 – Hamburg 1628) was a German mathematician and engineer. Albrecht invented a variety of instruments, some of which are described in his treatises on architecture and perspective: Instrument zur Architectur (Nuremberg, 1622); Eygendliche Beschreibung (Nuremberg, 1625); and Duo Libri. Prior de Perspectiva ... Posterior de umbra ... (Nuremberg, 1625).
