= Albert Stolow =

Canadian molecular photonics professor

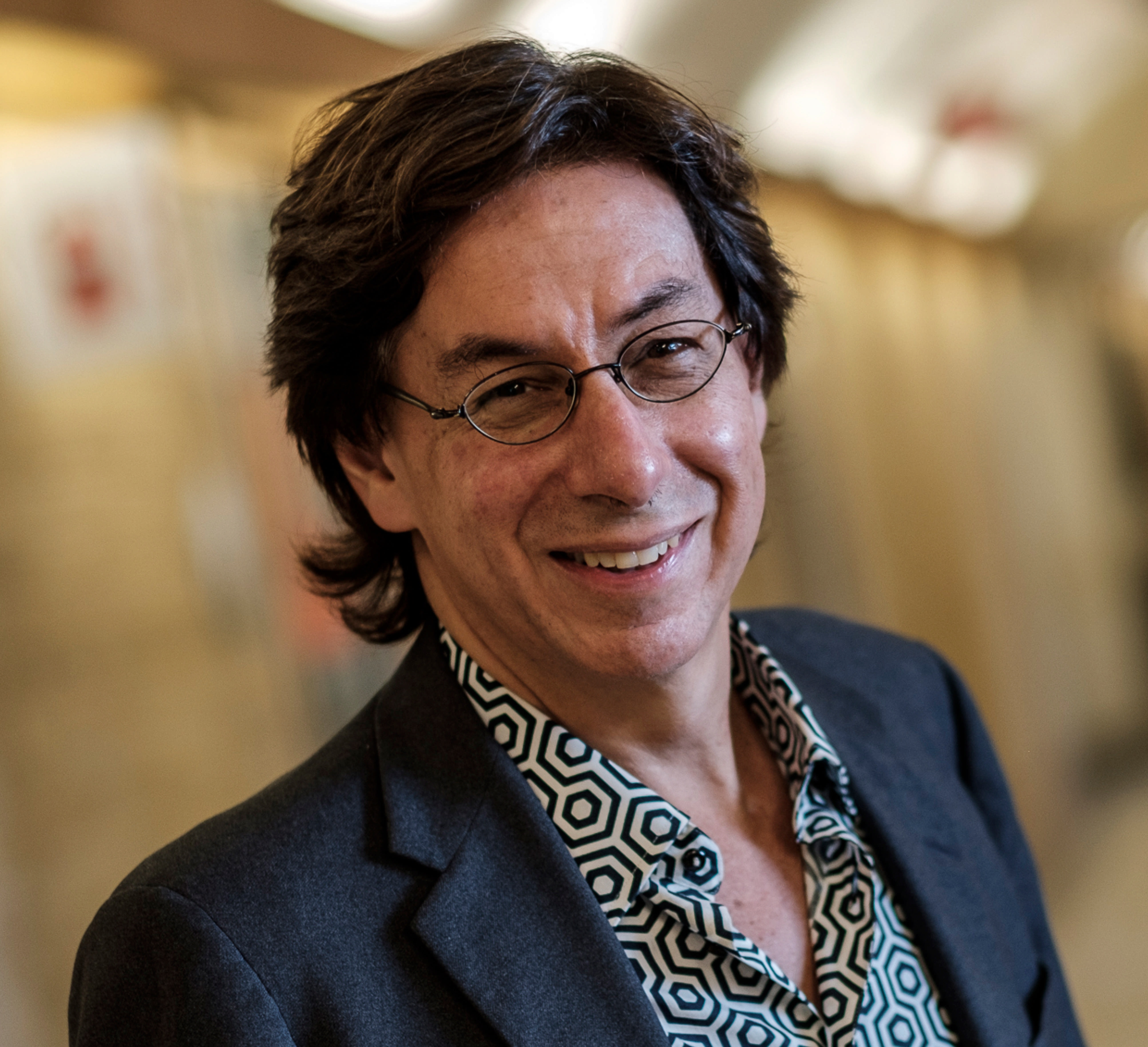
Stolow in 2016

Albert Stolow (born 1959) is a Canadian physicist. He is the Canada Research Chair in Molecular Photonics, full professor of chemistry & biomolecular sciences and of physics, and a member of the Ottawa Institute for Systems Biology at the University of Ottawa. He is the founder of the Molecular Photonics Group at the National Research Council of Canada. He is adjunct professor of Chemistry and of Physics at Queen's University in Kingston and a Fellow of the Max-Planck-uOttawa Centre for Extreme and Quantum Photonics and the NRC-uOttawa Joint Centre for Extreme Photonics.

== Education ==
Stolow studied Chemistry and Physics at Queen's University and then obtained his Ph.D. degree in chemical physics from the University of Toronto in 1988, studying under Nobel Laureate John C. Polanyi. Stolow was an NSERC post-doctoral fellow at the University of California, Berkeley from 1989 to 1992 where he worked with Nobel Laureate Yuan T. Lee. In fall 1992, Stolow joined the National Research Council in Ottawa where he established laboratories and research programs for the study of ultrafast molecular dynamics and quantum control. In 2014, he assumed the Canada Research Chair in Molecular Photonics at the University of Ottawa.

== Honors and awards ==
In 2008, he was elected a Fellow in the American Physical Society, nominated by its Division of Chemical Physics in 2008, for contributions to ultrafast laser science as applied to molecular physics, including time-resolved studies of non-adiabatic dynamics in excited molecules, non-perturbative quantum control of molecular dynamics, and dynamics of polyatomic molecules in strong laser fields. In 2008, Stolow won the Keith Laidler Award of the Canadian Society for Chemistry, for a distinguished contribution to the field of physical chemistry, recognizing early career achievement. In 2009, he was elected a Fellow of the Optical Society of America for the application of ultrafast optical techniques to molecular dynamics and control, in particular, studies of molecules in strong laser fields and the development of new methods of optical quantum control. In 2013, he was awarded the Queen Elizabeth II Diamond Jubilee Medal (Canada). In 2017, Stolow was awarded the Earle K. Plyler Prize for Molecular Spectroscopy and Dynamics of the American Physical Society for the development of methods for probing and controlling ultrafast dynamics in polyatomic molecules, including time-resolved photoelectron spectroscopy and imaging, strong field molecular ionization, and dynamic Stark quantum control. In 2018, Stolow was awarded the John C. Polanyi Award of the Canadian Society for Chemistry “for excellence by a scientist carrying out research in Canada in physical, theoretical or computational chemistry or chemical physics”. In 2020, he became Chair of the Division of Chemical Physics of the American Physical Society. In 2026, Stolow won the Ahmed Zewail Award of the American Chemical Society for "outstanding and creative contributions to fundamental discoveries or inventions in ultrafast science and technology in areas of physics, chemistry, biology, or related fields".

== Current Research ==
His group's research interests include ultrafast molecular dynamics and quantum control, time-resolved photoelectron spectroscopy and imaging, strong field & attosecond physics of polyatomic molecules, and coherent non-linear optical microscopy of live cells/tissues, materials and geological samples. In 2020, Stolow launched a major new high power (500 W) ultrafast laser facility at the University of Ottawa producing high energy, phase-controlled few-cycle pulses of 2 micron wavelength at 10 kHz repetition rate. These are used for High Harmonic Generation to produce bright ultrafast Soft X-ray pulses (up to 600 eV) for a new Ultrafast Xray Science Laboratory.

He is the son of Nathan Stolow (1929–2014), an art and document conservator and Sari Stolow (1928-2018), an oil painter and art conservator.

== See also ==
- List of fellows of the American Physical Society (1998–2010)
