= Carbon Engineering =

Canadian energy company

Coordinates: 49.6883°N 123.16244°W

Carbon Engineering Ltd.
- Type: Subsidiary
- Industry: Direct air capture
- Founded: 2009
- Headquarters: Squamish, British Columbia, Canada
- Key people: Daniel Friedmann, Chief Executive Officer, Board Chair; Kerri L. Fox, Chief Financial Officer; David Keith, Founder, Board Member
- Parent: Oxy Low Carbon Ventures
- Website: carbonengineering.com

Carbon Engineering Ltd. is a Canadian-based clean energy company focusing on the commercialization of direct air capture (DAC) technology that captures carbon dioxide (CO_{2}) directly from the atmosphere.

This captured CO_{2} can either be stored underground, or converted into carbon-neutral fuel using renewable energy sources, by a process the company calls "air to fuels". The company is running a pilot plant in Squamish, British Columbia, removing CO_{2} from the atmosphere since 2015 and converting it into fuels since December 2017.

The company was founded in 2009 by David Keith, now a professor in the Department of the Geophysical Sciences at the University of Chicago, and is now led by Daniel Friedmann as CEO, who served as the former CEO of Canadian aerospace company, MDA, for 20 years.

Carbon Engineering is funded by several government and sustainability-focused agencies as well as by private investors, including Microsoft founder Bill Gates and oil sands financier N. Murray Edwards. In addition, in 2019 the company received US$68 million from private investors, including fossil fuel companies Chevron Corporation, Occidental Petroleum, and BHP. In August 2023, Occidental Petroleum bought Carbon Engineering for $1.1B, with payments over 3 years, and the intention to build 100 DAC plants.

== Technology ==
Carbon Engineering's DAC system integrates two main cycles. The first cycle is the absorption of CO_{2} from the atmosphere in a device called an "air contactor" using an alkaline hydroxide solution, via patents such as US20140271379A1 and US20150329369A1. The second cycle regenerates the capture liquid used in the air contactor, and delivers pure CO_{2} as an end product. These cycles operate in tandem continuously, producing a concentrated stream of CO_{2} gas as an output, and requiring only energy, water, and small material make up streams as inputs. Energy is used in such a way that no new CO_{2} emissions are incurred, and thus do not counteract what was captured from the air. The captured atmospheric CO_{2} can be stored underground, used for enhanced oil recovery, or turned into low-carbon synthetic fuels using the company's "air to fuel" technology.

Carbon Engineering's air to fuel process can produce fuels such as gasoline, diesel, or jet A using inputs of atmospheric CO_{2}, water, and renewable electricity such as that from solar panels. Electricity is used to split water (by electrolysis) and manufacture hydrogen, which is then combined with captured atmospheric CO_{2} to form fuels. This approach offers a means to deliver clean fuels that are compatible with existing engines, and can help de-carbonize the transportation sector by displacing fuels made from crude oil.

== Pilot plant demonstration ==
In 2015, Carbon Engineering started operations of its full end-to-end pilot plant, located in Squamish, British Columbia, Canada. When running, this facility captures roughly 1 ton of atmospheric CO_{2} per day. In 2017, the company incorporated fuel synthesis capability into the DAC pilot plant and converted CO_{2} into fuel for the first time in December 2017.

Based on the data obtained from the pilot plant, Keith and colleagues published an article in 2018 that presents a simulation suggesting that CO_{2} can be captured from the atmosphere at a cost of between US$94 to US$233 per ton, "depending on financial assumptions, energy costs, and the specific choice of inputs and outputs".

Both DAC and air to fuel technologies have been proven at the pilot plant and are now being scaled up into commercial markets. Individual DAC facilities can be built to capture up to 1 million tons of CO_{2} per year in the near future. At that scale, one Carbon Engineering air capture plant could negate the emissions from ~250,000 cars—either by sequestering the CO_{2} or by using the recycled carbon dioxide as a feedstock to produce synthetic fuel.

== Commercialization ==
In May 2019, Carbon Engineering announced it was partnering with Oxy Low Carbon Ventures, LLC. (OLCV), a subsidiary of Occidental Petroleum, to design and engineer a large-scale DAC plant capable of capturing 500,000 tonnes of carbon dioxide from the air each year, which would be used in OLCV's enhanced oil recovery operations and subsequently stored underground permanently. Located in the Permian Basin, construction for the plant is expected to begin in 2022, with operations targeted for 2024. In September 2019, Carbon Engineering announced they were expanding the capacity of the design of the plant from 500,000 tonnes to an expected one million tonnes of CO_{2} captured per year. In August 2023, it was announced Occidental Petroleum had acquired all the outstanding equity of Carbon Engineering for $1.1 billion.
