= Philip Bunker =

British-Canadian scientist and author

Philip R. Bunker
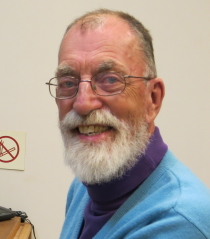
- Born: 29 June 1941 (age 85); London, England
- Citizenship: British; Canadian
- Education: King's College London (B.Sc.) University of Cambridge (Ph.D.)
- Known for: molecular symmetry methylene (CH_{2}) dimethylacetylene
- Awards: Humboldt Prize 1995
- Scientific career
- Fields: theoretical chemistry molecular spectroscopy
- Workplaces: National Research Council of Canada
- Doctoral advisor: Christopher Longuet-Higgins

Philip R. Bunker (born 29 June 1941) is a British-Canadian scientist and author, known for his work in theoretical chemistry and molecular spectroscopy.

== Education and early work ==
Philip Bunker was educated at Battersea Grammar School in Streatham. He received a bachelor's degree at King's College in 1962 and earned a Ph.D. in theoretical chemistry from Cambridge University in 1965, advised by H.C. Longuet-Higgins. The subject of his Ph.D. thesis was the spectrum of the dimethylacetylene molecule and its torsional barrier. During Bunker's Ph.D. work in 1963, Longuet-Higgins published the paper that introduced molecular symmetry groups consisting of feasible nuclear permutations and permutation-inversions. Under the guidance of Longuet-Higgins, Bunker applied these new symmetry ideas and introduced the notations G_{36} and G_{100} for the molecular symmetry groups of dimethylacetylene and ferrocene, respectively. After obtaining his Ph.D. degree, he was a postdoctoral fellow with Jon T. Hougen in the spectroscopy group of Gerhard Herzberg at the National Research Council of Canada. He then spent his entire career at the National Research Council of Canada, eventually rising to the position of principal research officer in 1997.

== Career and important contributions ==
Philip Bunker's published scientific work has focused on the use of fundamental quantum mechanics to predict and interpret the spectral properties of polyatomic molecules due to their combined rotational, vibrational, electronic and nuclear-spin states, and their symmetries. He has been particularly concerned with the study of the energy levels and spectra of molecules that undergo large amplitude vibrational motions. Applications of this work to the methylene (CH_{2}) molecule proved to be important in determining the separation between the singlet and triplet electronic states, and in determining which singlet and triplet rotational levels interact. In the 1990s, he returned to the problem of determining the torsional barrier in dimethylacetylene after Robert McKellar and John Johns, experimentalists at the National Research Council of Canada, had obtained a very high resolution infrared spectrum of the molecule.

Bunker is a well-known expert in the use of the molecular symmetry group. At the end of Longuet-Higgins' paper in which he introduced permutation and permutation-inversion molecular symmetry groups, Longuet-Higgins wrote: "In conclusion it should be added that the present definition can be extended to linear molecules, and to molecules where spin-orbit coupling is strong; but these topics are best dealt with separately." However, a few years later (in 1967) Longuet-Higgins left the field of theoretical chemistry; he wrote nothing more about molecular symmetry and did not make these extensions. Bunker then developed the extensions of these principles to linear molecules as well as to molecules with strong spin-orbit coupling. Bunker is also known for his work in the quantitative description of non-adiabatic effects in quantum molecular dynamics and for his contributions to studies using Coulomb explosion imaging. He has, with others, determined the effect of introducing angular measure as a dimension for the value of the Planck constant, and for the equations involved in using a Kibble balance.

Together with Per Jensen (1956-2022), who was a theoretical chemist at Bergische Universität Wuppertal, Bunker has written two books on theoretical chemistry and molecular spectroscopy; Molecular Symmetry and Spectroscopy (1998) and Fundamentals of Molecular Symmetry (2005). Currently, Bunker is Researcher Emeritus at the National Research Council of Canada and a guest scientist at the Fritz-Haber Institute of the Max Planck Society. He has also held visiting scientist positions at universities and institutions around the world during the course of his career, including ETH-Zurich, Massey University, Kyushu University and University of Florence. During the course of his career he has delivered over 400 invited lectures.

== Awards and honors ==
Bunker received the Humboldt Prize (1995), the Medaili Jana Marca Marci of the Czech Spectroscopy Society (2002), and the 2002 Sir Harold Thompson Memorial Award, which is sponsored by Pergamon Press (now Elsevier) for the most significant advance in spectroscopy published in Spectrochimica Acta each year. He is a Fellow of the International Union of Pure and Applied Chemistry.

== Personal life ==
Bunker married Eva Cservenits in 1966. Their son, Alex E. Bunker, is a computational biophysicist at the University of Helsinki.

== Selected presentations ==
- Bunker, P. R. (2008). "Near symmetry in our universe: The origin of life and the preponderance of matter over antimatter". Ohio State University.
- “The Planck constant and its units,” The 35th Symposium on Chemical Physics at the University of Waterloo, Ontario, Canada, November 3, 2019. on YouTube
