= Hoyt C. Hottel =

American academic (1903–1998)

Hoyt Clarke Hottel (1903 – 18 August 1998) was a professor in the department of Chemical Engineering at the Massachusetts Institute of Technology (MIT). He was an expert on energy, radiant heat transfer, fire, fuels and combustion.

In 1984, he wrote the often quoted words: "A case can be made for fire being, next to the life processes, the most complex of phenomena to understand".

== Professional life ==
Hottel received his first degree, BSc, in chemistry from the Indiana University in 1922. He then joined MIT and received the SM in chemical engineering in 1924. He was named an assistant professor in 1928, associate professor in 1931 and full professor in 1941. In 1965 he was named the first Carbon P. Dubbs Professor of Chemical Engineering. He became professor emeritus in 1968.

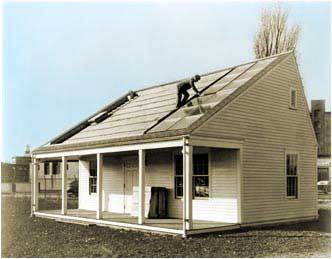
MIT Solar House #1 (1939)

From 1938 to 1988, a series of six "MIT Solar Houses" were built on the MIT campus and elsewhere in Massachusetts, as demonstration prototypes of solar heating technology. Hottel chaired the MIT Research Committee on Solar Energy from 1938-1964 and built three of these solar houses. He directed research on non-biological uses of solar energy by humanity. His work led to development of the first accurate analytical models for solar heat collectors. The modeling and testing work led to what is currently known as the Hottel-Whillier model of the flat plate collector.

During World War II, Hottel was chief of the National Defense Research Committee group that studied and developed incendiary bombs. He chaired the Armed Forces Special Weapons Project Panel on Thermal Radiation from 1949 to 1956.

From 1956 to 1967 he chaired the National Academy of Sciences Fire Research committee, which studied tactics to fight large fires, including forest fires and fire storms in urban areas. He was a member of the National Academy of Sciences, the National Academy of Engineering and a fellow of the American Academy of Arts and Sciences and the American Institute of Chemical Engineers.

Hottel co-authored three books, contributed sections to 15 others and wrote more than 150 technical papers while acquiring eight patents.

== Awards ==
Hottel received many distinguished professional awards, including the Medal for Merit in 1948, a civilian award, for "exceptionally meritorious conduct in the performance of outstanding services to the United States" for his World War II service. The British government honored him for his role in the war with the King's Medal for Service in the Cause of Freedom. He also received the 1960 Sir Alfred Egerton Gold Medal from the Combustion Institute (which he co-founded) and the Melchett Medal from the Institute of Fuel in Great Britain. He received the Max Jakob Award from the American Institute of Chemical Engineers and the American Society of Mechanical Engineers in 1966 and the Founders Award from the Institute of Chemical Engineers the next year. In 1975 he received the Farrington Daniels Award of the International Solar Energy Society. In 1977 he was inducted in Solar Hall of Fame.

He continues to be remembered through the Hottel Lecture, the most prestigious award at the International Symposia of The Combustion Institute. MIT instituted the Hoyt C. Hottel Lectureship in 1985, and he delivered the inaugural lecture. The Hoyt C. Hottel Professorship in chemical engineering at MIT was established in 1995.

The Hoyt Clarke Hottel Award is made each year by the American Solar Energy Society Awards Committee. The primary requirement is that the recipient has made a significant contribution to the technology in any area of the energy field.

== Other sources ==
- "Hoyt C. Hottel". Memorial Tributes: Volume 10. Washington, DC: The National Academies Press. 2002. doi:10.17226/10403.
- "Hoyt Hottel's skepticism". solarhousehistory.com. 30 November 2013.
