= David Wixon Pratt =

American physicist

David Wixon Pratt is an American physicist, Professor of Chemistry at the University of Pittsburgh.

In 1959, he gained an A.B. in Chemistry from Princeton University. He served as a fleet officer in the U.S. Navy from 1959 to 1962. In 1967, he obtained a Ph.D. from the University of California at Berkeley on magnetic resonance. He then did postdoc research at the University of California at Santa Barbara on optical spectroscopy before moving in 1968 to become Professor of Chemistry at the University of Pittsburgh.

He was awarded the status of Fellow in the American Physical Society, after he was nominated by the Division of Chemical Physics in 1990, for "significant contributions to molecular spectroscopy, particularly the elucidation of intramolecular relaxation in intermediate molecules, and the development of laser-induced phosphorescence spectroscopy and ultrahigh-resolution spectroscopy in supersonic jets". He is a fellow of the American Association for the Advancement of Science and a member of the American Chemical Society.

He was awarded the 1999 APS Earle K. Plyler Prize for Molecular Spectroscopy for "pioneering work in ultrahigh resolution ultraviolet spectroscopy of cold molecules in beams that elucidated the structure and isomerization dynamics of a wide range of large molecules, molecular vibrational dynamics, and hydrogen bonding".

== See also ==
- List of fellows of the American Physical Society (1972–1997)
