= Lester Andrews =

American chemist

- Born: William Lester Self Andrews; January 31, 1942 (age 84); Lincolnton, North Carolina, U.S.
- Education: Mississippi State University, University of California
- Scientific career
- Fields: Photochemistry
- Institutions: University of Virginia
- Thesis: Spectroscopic Studies of Reactions of Lithium Atoms in Inert Gas Matrices (1966)

William Lester Self Andrews is an American chemist who makes contributions to the ongoing development of quantum chemistry of metallic complexes. He is the Professor Emeritus of Chemistry at the University of Virginia. He won the Earle K. Plyler Prize for Molecular Spectroscopy in 2010 for "vibrational spectroscopy in cryogenic matrices that combined with quantum calculations, has led to the identification and characterization of many molecules, ions, and complexes across the periodic table".

He was born in Lincolnton, North Carolina. His first degree was in chemical engineering at Mississippi State University in 1963 and his doctorate was in physical chemistry at Berkeley in 1966.

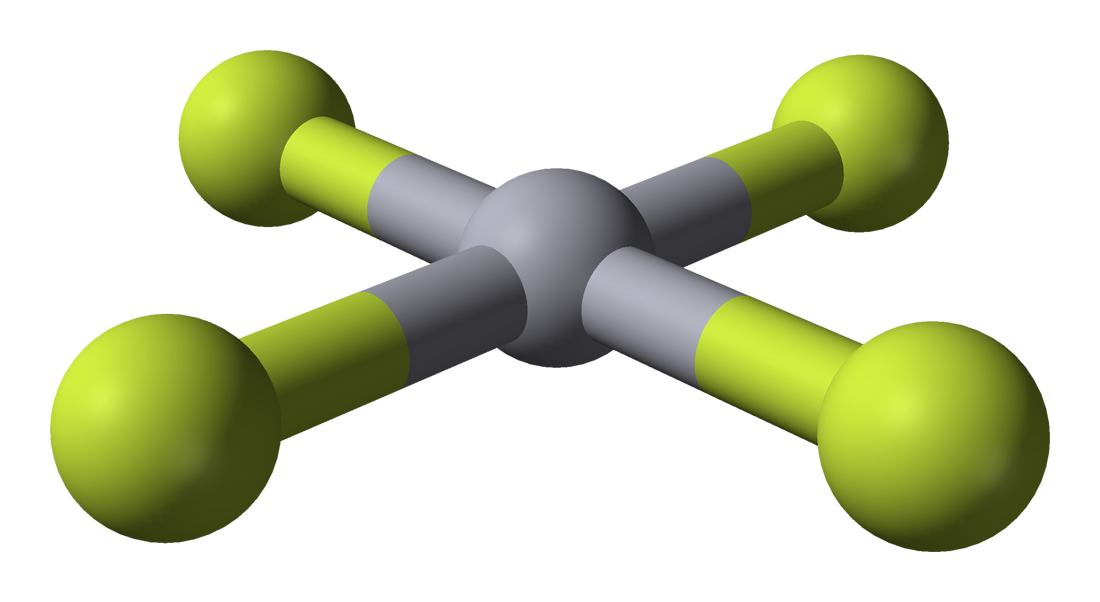
Mercury tetrafluoride's structure was studied in the 2007 paper Mercury is a Transition Metal: The First Experimental Evidence for HgF_{4} which Professor Andrews co-authored.
