= Andreas Albrecht (chemist) =

American physical chemist

Andreas Christoph Albrecht (3 June 1927 – 26 September 2002) was an American physical chemist.

== Life ==
Andreas Christoph Albrecht was born in California and raised in Washington, D.C., Baton Rouge and Vienna. His father was a German anthropologist. He studied chemistry at University of California, Berkeley, where he met Genia Solomon, who would later become his wife. He completed his studies in 1950. The pair moved to Washington state for graduate school. They both earned doctorates in 1954 from the University of Washington, his in chemistry under W. T. Simpson and hers in biochemistry. Subsequently, Andreas and Genia moved to Cambridge, Massachusetts to work as postdoctoral researchers. His postdoctoral supervisor was Walter H. Stockmayer at Massachusetts Institute of Technology. Genia worked at Harvard University.

In 1956 they moved to Ithaca, New York so that he could become an instructor at Cornell University. He was later promoted to Assistant Professor (1957), Associate Professor (1962) and full Professor (1965) of physical chemistry. Genia paused her scientific pursuits to raise four children. In the 1980s she resumed her career and became a Senior Lecturer in Biochemistry at Cornell where she was honored for her teaching contributions.

== Research ==
Albrecht is most well known for his work on the theory of resonance Raman scattering intensities. He developed two of the main methods for analyzing Raman enhancement patterns. The first of these is the sum-over-states method, developed in the 1960s. After the development of the competing time-dependent wavepacket method by Lee and Heller, Albrecht's group developed the transform theory of resonance Raman enhancement.

Other notable research developments by his group research include thermal lensing spectroscopy, and the concept of local molecular vibrational modes.

== Awards and achievements ==
Andreas Albrecht had many achievements and belonged to many scientific societies. He also had several visiting professorships. In 1986 he was given the New York Academy of Science Polychrome Corporation Award in Photochemistry, in 1988 the Lippincott-Medal and in 1990 the Earle K. Plyler Prize from the American Physical Society. In 1992 he joined the American Academy of Arts and Sciences. A special issue of The Journal of Physical Chemistry A was dedicated to him after his death.
