= Herbert L. Strauss =

Chemist

- Born: March 26, 1936; Aachen, Germany
- Died: December 2, 2014 (aged 78); Berkeley, California
- Education: Columbia University
- Partners: Carolyn North Cooper
- Children: 3
- Scientific career
- Institutions: University of California, Berkeley.

Herbert Leopold Strauss (March 26, 1936 – December 2, 2014) was an American chemist who specialized in spectroscopy. His family fled Nazi Germany and eventually immigrated to New York, where he graduated from Columbia University. He spent the entirety of his career at the University of California, Berkeley.

== Early life and education ==
Herbert Leopold Strauss, who went by "Herb", was born on March 26, 1936, in Aachen, Germany to parents Joan and Charles Strauss. He had a younger brother, Walter. The Strauss family escaped Germany in 1939, arriving in England. While in London, Herbert Strauss was temporarily placed in an orphanage, where he became seriously ill from bronchitis and nearly died. The family eventually immigrated to Kew Gardens, Queens in New York City. There, his father worked as a real estate agent and his mother worked in a clothing store. Strauss received both a bachelor's degree (1957) and a PhD (1960) in chemistry from Columbia University.

== Career ==
Upon finishing his PhD, he spent a year conducting post-doctoral research at the University of Oxford. The first teaching position he accepted was at the University of California, Berkeley; he would remain at UC Berkeley for the rest of his career. He specialized in spectroscopy, using Fourier-transform infrared spectroscopy to determine the traits of various molecules. He also employed Raman spectroscopy and neutron spectroscopy "to study the rotations and vibrations of molecular hydrogen embedded in various systems".

From 1976 to 2000, he was the editor of the Annual Review of Physical Chemistry. From 1995–2008, he was the Associate Dean of Undergraduate Affairs. He officially retired from Berkeley in 2003, though continued to teach until shortly before his death.

== Awards and honors ==
In 1976, he was elected as a fellow to the American Physical Society. In 1994, he won both the Bomem-Michelson Prize for Spectroscopy and the Lippincott Award for Vibrational Spectroscopy. In 2003 he received the Berkeley Citation and Berkeley Faculty Service Award.

== Personal life and death ==
In 1957, he met Carolyn North Cooper at a church in Manhattan during a midnight mass, despite both being Jewish. He and Carolyn had three children together. He enjoyed cycling, and commuted to and from campus each day via bicycle. Strauss died on December 2, 2014, at his home in Berkeley, California, at the age of 78.
