= Richard P. Van Duyne =

American chemist and educator

Richard P. Van Duyne (1945–2019) was an American chemist and professor of chemistry at Northwestern University. He was known for his development of surface-enhanced Raman scattering (SERS) and nanoplasmonics initially for analytical and physical chemistry, but the high sensitivity of these methods resulted in numerous applications in chemistry, materials science and engineering, physics, and medicine. He definitively demonstrated the single molecule sensitivity of SERS.

Van Duyne was recognized by numerous awards, including the Earle K. Plyler Prize for Molecular Spectroscopy of the American Physical Society, the E. Bright Wilson Award in Spectroscopy and the Analytical Chemistry Award of the American Chemical Society. He was also elected a fellow of the American Academy of Arts and Sciences and the National Academy of Sciences. In 2008, he received the Ellis R. Lippincott Award. After he passed away in 2019, ACS published a special edition list of some of his publications, and some of his colleagues wrote articles about his work.
