= Anthony M. Dean =

American engineer

Anthony M. Dean is an American engineer. He is an emeritus professor of chemical and biological engineering at Colorado School of Mines, and formerly held the W. K. Coors Distinguished Professorship (2000-2012). He also worked at the University of Missouri-Columbia (1970-1979) and Exxon Research and Engineering Company (1979-2000).

Dean received a Bachelor of Science in chemistry from Spring Hill College, after which received a Master of Arts and Doctor of Philosophy in physical chemistry from Harvard University.
