= Earle K. Plyler =

American physicist (1897–1976)

Earle Keith Plyler
- Born: April 26, 1897; Greenville, South Carolina, US
- Died: June 8, 1976 (aged 79); Tallahassee, Florida, US
- Resting place: Roselawn Cemetery, Tallahassee, Florida, US; 30.48670°N 84.26720°W
- Education: B.A., M.A., Ph.D. Physics
- Alma mater: Furman University, Johns Hopkins Univ., Columbia University
- Occupation: Molecular Spectroscopist
- Known for: Pioneering scientific work in Infrared Spectroscopy

Earle Keith Plyler (April 26, 1897 in Greenville, South Carolina – June 8, 1976 in Tallahassee, Florida), was an American physicist and an important pioneer of infrared spectroscopy and molecular spectroscopy. He is the namesake of the "Earle K. Plyler Prize" of the American Physical Society.

== Life ==
Plyler originates from Greenville, South Carolina, where he graduated in Physics from Furman University (B.A. 1917, M.A. 1918). After scientific work at Johns Hopkins University he obtained his Ph.D. in 1924 at Columbia University. From 1924 until 1941 Plyler lectured at the University of North Carolina at Chapel Hill, subsequently at the University of Michigan from 1941 until 1945. In 1945 Plyler joined the National Bureau of Standards where he worked until 1962, when he became professor at Florida State University in Tallahassee.

== Achievements ==
Earle Plyler was an important pioneer of Molecular Spectroscopy and Infrared Spectroscopy. In his memory the American Physical Society regularly issues the "Earle K. Plyler Prize" for outstanding achievements in Molecular Spectroscopy. The Plyler Prize has already been issued to Nobel Prize Winners three times.

== Sources ==
- Interview of Dr. Earle K. Plyler by E. Scott Barr and W. James King on April 7, 1964, Niels Bohr Library & Archives, American Institute of Physics, College Park, MD USA
- Plyler, Earle Keith: E. K. Plyler Intellectual autobiography, 1962. OCLC 881397180
- ISNI 0000000366489390
- VIAF 33160483847204992183
