= Donald Levy =

American chemical physicist (born 1939)

Donald H. Levy
- Born: June 30, 1939 (age 86); Youngstown, OH
- Occupation: Chemist
- Known for: Supersonic molecular beams
- Awards: E. Bright Wilson Award in Spectroscopy (2006); Ellis Lippincott Award; Plyler Prize (1987)

Donald Harris Levy (born June 30, 1939) is an American chemical physicist on the faculty of the University of Chicago, Chicago, US. He is recognized as a leader in the development of supersonic jet cooling.

== Biography ==
Donald Levy has been a member of the University of Chicago Chemistry faculty since 1967. He is presently the Albert A. Michelson Distinguished Service Professor Emeritus. His research interests have included laser spectroscopy in supersonic molecular beams and jets, the structure of van der Waals molecules, energy transfer in weakly bound molecular systems, bichromophoric organic molecules, and multi-photonionization spectroscopy. From 1998 to 2008 he was editor of the Journal of Chemical Physics. In 2005, he was chair of the Universities Science Policy Council, a group responsible for guiding high level scientific directions at Argonne National Laboratory, awarding joint appointments, and negotiating student and faculty access to National User Facilities at Argonne. After 2007, he was named by the University of Chicago Vice President for Research and for National Laboratories, CEO of UChicago Argonne, LLC and a Member of the Board of Directors of Fermi National Accelerator Laboratory.

He has been a member of the National Academy of Sciences since 1988. He is a Fellow of the American Academy of Arts and Sciences, the American Physical Society and the American Association for the Advancement of Science. He is the past chairman of the chemistry department at the University of Chicago, where he played an important role as a leader for planning the Gordon Center for Integrative Science.

== Awards ==
He was awarded the Plyler Prize of the American Physical Society in 1987, the E. Bright Wilson Award in Spectroscopy in 2006, and the Ellis Lippincott Award from the Optical Society of America.
