= James Kay Graham Watson =

Molecular spectroscopist (died 2020)

- Citizenship: Canadian
- Known for: Molecular Hamiltonian
- Scientific career
- Fields: theoretical chemistry molecular spectroscopy
- Workplaces: National Research Council of Canada

Jim Watson, FRS, (20 April 1936—18 December 2020) who published under the name J.K.G. Watson, was a molecular spectroscopist most well known for the development of the widely used molecular Hamiltonians named after him (sometimes called "Watsonians" or "Watson Hamiltonians"). These Hamiltonians are used to describe the quantum dynamics of molecules.

== Education and career ==
Watson did his PhD at the University of Glasgow, and worked in the UK, United States and Canada. He was a postdoctoral fellow under Jon Hougen in the Molecular Spectroscopy Group of Gerhard Herzberg at the National Research Council of Canada in Ottawa, Ontario from 1963 to 1965. He eventually joined the staff in the group in 1982 where he remained until retirement.

Watson published a number of papers in which he developed and applied molecular Hamiltonians to problems in spectroscopy. In 1968 Watson published Simplification of the molecular vibration-rotation Hamiltonian, in which he presented a practical framework for the quantum-mechanical description of molecular ro-vibrational dynamics within the Born–Oppenheimer approximation.

== Honors and awards ==
He was a Fellow of the Royal Society, the Royal Society of Canada and the American Physical Society. He received the 1986 Earle K. Plyer Prize for Molecular Spectroscopy and Dynamics from the American Physical Society. The citation reads:

"For his numerous fundamental contributions to the theory of rovibronic interactions in molecules, especially the development of the universally used Watson Hamiltonian for vibration-rotation energy levels, the unified treatment of centrifugal distortion in molecules, the elucidation of forbidden rotational transitions in spherical tops, the application of advanced symmetry arguments to perturbations in external fields, and investigations of the Jahn-Teller effect in $\ce{H_3}$ and $\ce{NH_4}$."

== Personal life ==
Watson was married to Carolyn Kerr. He died in his home in New Edinburgh after a brief illness on 17 December 2020 at the age of 84.
