= Richard J. Saykally =

American chemist

Richard James Saykally
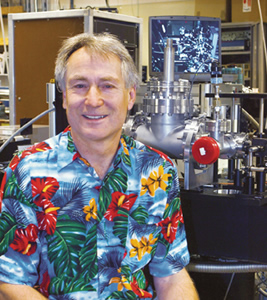
- Born: September 10, 1947 (age 78); Rhinelander, Wisconsin, USA
- Known for: Molecular characteristics and structure of water
- Awards: Irving Langmuir Award (2000); E. O. Lawrence Award (2004); Peter Debye Award (2009)
- Scientific career
- Fields: Chemistry
- Workplaces: University of California, Berkeley
- Thesis: Microwave spectroscopy of transient molecular species in glow discharges (1977)
- Doctoral advisor: R. Claude Woods
- Other academic advisors: Kenneth M. Evenson
- Doctoral students: Frank Keutsch; Lucy Ziurys; Martin Gruebele
- Other notable students: James R. Heath (postdoc)

Richard James Saykally (born September 10, 1947) is an American chemist and the Class of 1932 Endowed Professor of Chemistry at the University of California, Berkeley, where he studies the molecular characteristics of water and aqueous solutions.

== Biography ==
Saykally was born in Rhinelander, Wisconsin and completed his undergraduate education at the University of Wisconsin-Eau Claire. He received his PhD from the University of Wisconsin–Madison under R. Claude Woods in 1977, then completed postgraduate research at the National Institute of Standards and Technology with Kenneth Melvin Evenson. He joined the faculty at the University of California, Berkeley in 1979.

Saykally and his students developed velocity modulation spectroscopy to study gaseous ions, including the hydronium (H_{3}O^{+}), hydroxide (OH^{−}), and ammonium (NH_{4}^{+}) ions. His group applied terahertz laser vibration-rotation-tunneling spectroscopy to map the hydrogen bonding in water clusters and develop accurate potentials for liquid water. His early research also determined the structure and spectroscopy of small carbon clusters.

His laboratory shifted toward condensed-phase systems in the early 2000s. Saykally used nonlinear optical methods and X-ray spectroscopy of liquid microjets to evaluate the solvation of ions at air-water and oil-water interfaces. His recent work implements nonlinear techniques at free-electron lasers to analyze graphite surfaces.

== Honors and awards ==
Saykally is an elected member of the National Academy of Sciences and the American Academy of Arts and Sciences. He is a fellow of the American Physical Society, the Optical Society of America, and the Royal Society of Chemistry.

The U.S. Department of Energy awarded Saykally the Ernest Orlando Lawrence Award in 2004 for his development of velocity modulation spectroscopy. The American Chemical Society recognized him with the Irving Langmuir Award in Chemical Physics in 2000, the Peter Debye Award in Physical Chemistry in 2009, and the E. Bright Wilson Award in Spectroscopy in 2018.

The Royal Society of Chemistry awarded him the Bourke Award in 1992, the Centenary Medal in 2000, and the Faraday Lectureship Prize in 2012. He held the Hinshelwood Lectureship at Oxford University in 2006 and the Inaugural Solvay Chair in Chemistry at the Solvay Institutes in 2008. He received the Helmholtz International Fellow Award in 2018.
