= Slichter =

Slichter is a surname. Notable people with the surname include:

- Charles Pence Slichter (1924–2018), American physicist
- Charles S. Slichter (1864–1946), American mathematician
- Jacob Slichter (born 1961), American musician
- Louis B. Slichter (1896–1978), American physicist and geophysicist
- Sumner Slichter (1892–1959), American economist

== See also ==
- Slichter Foreland, in Antarctica
