= Charles Slichter =

Charles Slichter may refer to:

- Charles S. Slichter (1864–1946), mathematician and physicist
- Charles Pence Slichter (1924–2018), American physicist
