= Single-molecule electric motor =

The single-molecule electric motor is an electrically operated synthetic molecular motor made from a single butyl methyl sulphide molecule. The molecule is adsorbed onto a copper (111) single-crystal piece by chemisorption. The motor, the world's smallest electric motor, is just a nanometer (billionth of a meter) across (60 000 times smaller than the thickness of a human hair). It was developed by the Sykes group and scientists at the Tufts University School of Arts and Sciences and published online September 4, 2011.

== Background ==
Single-molecule motors have been demonstrated before. These motors were either powered by chemical reactions or by light. This is the first experimental demonstration of electrical energy successfully coupling to directed molecular rotation.

== Mechanism of directed rotation ==
Butyl methyl sulfide is an asymmetrical thioether which is achiral in the gas phase. The molecule can be adsorbed to the surface through either of the sulfur's two lone pair. This gives rise to the surface bound chirality of the molecule. The asymmetry of the molecular surface interface gives rise to an asymmetrical barrier to rotation. The molecule rotates around this sulfur-copper bond. Electrons quantum tunneling from the STM tip electrically excite molecular vibrations, which couple to rotational modes. The rotation of the motor can be controlled by adjusting the electron flux from the scanning tunneling microscope and the background temperature. The tip of the scanning electron microscope acts as an electrode. The chiralities of the tip of the STM and the molecule determine the rate and direction of rotation. Images taken of the molecule at 5 K and under non-perturbative scanning conditions show a crescent-shaped protrusion of the molecule. When the temperature is raised to 8 K, the molecule starts rotating along six orientations determined by the hexagonal structure of the copper it is adsorbed on. In this case, a STM image taken of the molecule appears as a hexagon as the timescale of the imaging is much slower than the rotation rate of the molecule.

== Determination of rate and direction of rotation ==
The six states of rotation of the molecule can be determined by aligning the tip of the scanning electron microscope asymmetrically on the side of one of the lobes of the molecule during spectroscopy measurements. When the butyl tail is nearest to the tip of the microscope, the tunneling current would be maximum and vice versa. The position of the molecule on the surface can be determined by the tunneling current. By plotting the position versus time the rate and direction of rotation can be determined. At higher temperatures, the single-molecule motor rotates too fast (up to one million rotations per second at 100 K) to monitor.

== Application ==
The single-molecule electric motor can be efficiently used in engineering, nanotechnological applications and medicinal applications, where drugs could be delivered to specified locations more accurately. By altering the chemical structure of the molecule, it could become a component of a nanoelectromechanical system (NEMS). It also has potential to be utilized to generate microwave radiation.

== See also ==
- Single molecule electronics
- Single molecule magnet
- Single molecule experiment
