= James L. Skinner =

American theoretical chemist (born 1953)

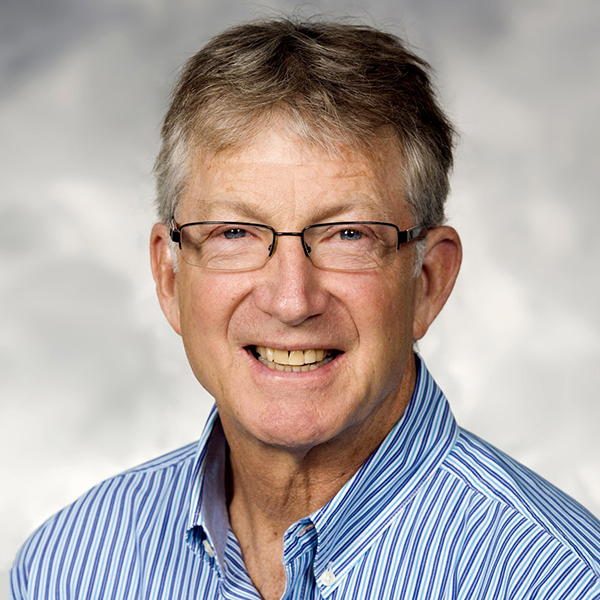
- Skinner in 2017
- Born: August 17, 1953 (age 73)
- Citizenship: United States
- Education: University of California, Santa Cruz; Harvard University
- Awards: member of the National Academy of Sciences, member of American Academy of Arts and Sciences, member of American Association for the Advancement of Science
- Scientific career
- Fields: Theoretical Chemistry; Statistical Mechanics; Spectroscopy
- Workplaces: Columbia University; University of Wisconsin-Madison; University of Chicago
- Doctoral advisor: Peter G. Wolynes
- Doctoral students: Yu-Shan Lin

James L. Skinner (born August 17, 1953) is an American theoretical chemist. He is the Joseph O. and Elizabeth S. Hirschfelder Professor Emeritus at the University Wisconsin-Madison. Until 2024 he was a member of the Scientific Advisory Board of the Welch Foundation. Until 2020, Skinner was the Crown Family Professor of Molecular Engineering, professor of chemistry, director of the Water Research Initiative and deputy dean for faculty affairs of the Pritzker School of Molecular Engineering at the University of Chicago. Skinner is recognized for his contributions to the fields of theoretical chemistry, nonequilibrium statistical mechanics, linear and nonlinear spectroscopy of liquids, amorphous and crystalline solids, surfaces, proteins, and supercritical fluids. Skinner is the co-author of over 230 peer-reviewed research articles.

== Education ==
Skinner received his A. B. in chemistry and physics, both with highest honors, from the University of California, Santa Cruz in 1975. He received a Ph.D. in chemical physics from Harvard University in 1979 where he was a recipient of an NSF Graduate Fellowship and studied under the guidance of Peter G. Wolynes. The following year Skinner spent as an NSF Postdoctoral Fellow at Stanford University, where he worked with Hans Andersen and Michael Fayer.

== Career ==
Skinner joined the department of chemistry at Columbia University as an assistant professor of chemistry in 1981. He was promoted to associate professor in 1985 and became a professor of chemistry in 1986. In 1990, Skinner was appointed as the director of the Theoretical Chemistry Institute and became the Joseph O. and Elizabeth S. Hirschfelder Professor of Chemistry at the University of Wisconsin-Madison. From 2004 to 2007, Skinner served as the chair of the department of chemistry at the University of Wisconsin-Madison. In 2015–2016, he served on the University of Wisconsin Campus Planning Committee and the Academic Planning Council. Skinner resigned his position as the director of the Theoretical Chemistry Institute and retired from the University of Wisconsin-Madison in December 2016, where he currently holds the title of Joseph O. and Elizabeth S. Hirschfelder Professor Emeritus. In January 2017, Skinner joined the Institute for Molecular Engineering (now Pritzker School of Molecular Engineering) at the University of Chicago as the Crown Family Professor of Molecular Engineering. He also served as the director of the Water Research Initiative and deputy dean for faculty affairs at the Pritzker School of Molecular Engineering. In 2020, he moved back to his position at the University of Wisconsin.

== Professional service ==
During his career Skinner has held multiple professional appointments. From 1993 to 1996, he was, consequently, the vice-chair, chair-elect, and chair of the theoretical subdivision of the physical division of the American Chemical Society and from 2000 to 2004 he was the vice-chair-elect, vice-chair, vice-chair and then chair of the Gordon Conference on Molecular Electronic Spectroscopy. In 2007, he was a member of the Committee of Visitors of the NSF Chemistry Division. From 2007 to 2010, Skinner was a member-at-large of the chemical physics division of the American Physical Society. From 2011 to 2014, he was the vice-chair, chair-elect, and the chair of chemical physics division of the American Physical Society. Since 2008 Skinner was a vice-chair and in 2014 he was the chair of American Conference on Theoretical Chemistry. While at the University of Chicago, Skinner actively participated in the University of Chicago-Argonne National Laboratory partnership by serving on the advisory board of the Midwest Integrated Center for Computational Materials in 2016. Since 2015, he is an active member of the scientific advisory board of the Welch Foundation. Since 2017, Skinner has been actively involved in the governance of the Telluride Science and Research Center (TSRC). From 2017 to 2019, he was a member of the board of directors of TSRC, becoming president of TSRC in 2018.

=== Editorial service ===
Skinner has served on editorial boards of several scientific journals, including Single Molecules (2000–2003), Journal of Physical Chemistry (2004–2006), Chemical Physics (2005–2009), and Molecular Physics (2008–2014). Skinner had a long-standing relationship with The Journal of Chemical Physics. In 1999, he joined the editorial board, and became an associate editor in 2009. Since 2015, Skinner served as a deputy editor of The Journal of Chemical Physics, retiring from his editorial service in 2019.

== Honors and awards ==
Throughout his career Skinner has received numerous awards including the ACS Irving Langmuir Award in Chemical Physics (2012), ACS Division of Physical Chemistry Award in Theoretical Chemistry (2011), Hilldale Award in the Physical Sciences, University of Wisconsin-Madison (2015), Wisconsin Alumni Research Foundation (WARF) named professorship, University of Wisconsin Chancellor's Distinguished Teaching Award (2003), Pharmacia Teaching Award, department of chemistry, University of Wisconsin-Madison (2000), Phi Lambda Upsilon Fresenius Award (1989), Camille and Henry Dreyfus Teacher-Scholar Award (1984–89), National Science Foundation Presidential Young Investigator (1984–1989), National Science Foundation Postdoctoral Fellowship (1980–1981), and National Science Foundation Graduate Fellowship (1975–1978). Skinner is a member of the National Academy of Sciences (2012), American Academy of Arts and Sciences (2006), American Association for the Advancement of Science (2003). He is an Alfred P. Sloan Fellow (1984–88), Guggenheim Fellow (1993–94), Humboldt Foundation Senior Scientist (1993–97), Fellow of the American Chemical Society (2012) and American Physical Society (1997).

=== Named and distinguished lectures ===
- Kistiakowsky Prize Lecture, Harvard University, 2019.
- Rockwell Lecture, University of Houston, 2019.
- Joe L. Franklin Memorial Lecture, Rice University, 2019.
- A. D. Little Lectures, Massachusetts Institute of Technology, 2019.
- Borden Lecture, University of Washington, 2019.
- Daniel Kivelson Lecture, University of California Los Angeles, 2017.
- Frontiers in Spectroscopy Lectures, Ohio State University, 2016.
- Malcolm Dole Lectures in Physical Chemistry, Northwestern University, 2015.
- Sessler Lecture, Stanford University, 2015.
- E. U. Condon Lecture, University of Colorado Boulder, 2013.
- Priestley Lecture, Pennsylvania State University, 2013.
- Vasser Woolley Distinguished Lecture, Georgia Tech, 2013.
- Hirschmann Visiting Professor Lectures, University of Pennsylvania, 2013.
- TSRC R. Stephen Berry Lecture, Telluride CO, 2012.
- University of Missouri Chancellor's Distinguished Visitor, 2012.
- W. Albert Noyes, Jr. Memorial Lecturer, University of Rochester, 2008.
- Bryan Earl Kohler Lecturer, University of California, Riverside, 2005.
- Reilly Lecturer, University of Notre Dame, 2003.
- Norman Hascoe Distinguished Lecturer, University of Connecticut, 1998.
- Gerhard Closs Lecturer, University of Chicago, 1997.
- Davidson Lecturer, University of Kansas, 1995.
