= Harden M. McConnell =

American physical chemist

- Born: July 18, 1927; Richmond, Virginia
- Died: October 8, 2014 (aged 87); Atherton, California
- Education: George Washington University (B.S 1947), California Institute of Technology (Ph.D., 1951)
- Known for: spin-labeling
- Awards: Wolf Prize in Chemistry
- Scientific career
- Fields: Physical chemistry
- Workplaces: Shell Development Company, California Institute of Technology, Stanford University
- Doctoral advisor: Norman Davidson, John D. Roberts, Linus Pauling
- Doctoral students: Roger D. Kornberg

Harden Marsden McConnell (July 18, 1927 – October 8, 2014) was an American physical chemist. His many awards included the National Medal of Science and the Wolf Prize, and he was elected to the National Academy of Science."

== Education and career ==
Harden earned a B.S. degree in chemistry from George Washington University in 1947, and his Ph.D. in chemistry from the California Institute of Technology in 1951 with Norman Davidson. After serving for two years as a National Research Fellow in physics at the University of Chicago with Robert S. Mulliken and John Platt, he held a position as research chemist at Shell Development Company. He was recruited by Norman Davidson, John D. Roberts, and Linus Pauling at the California Institute of Technology in 1956 as assistant professor of chemistry, he was promoted to professor of chemistry and physics in 1963, and in 1964 he moved to Stanford University as a professor. In 1979 he was named Robert Eckles Swain Professor of Chemistry at Stanford University. From September 1989 to September 1992, he was head of the department of chemistry at Stanford. On September 1, 2000, Harden was granted emeritus status.

== Research ==
McConnell did important research to the understanding of the relation between molecular electronic structure and electron and nuclear magnetic resonance spectra during the period of 1955 through 1965. After that, he developed the technique of spin-labels, whereby electron and nuclear magnetic resonance spectra can be used to study the structure and kinetics of proteins and membranes.

He recognized that the discovery of nuclear hyperfine interactions in aromatic free radicals represented a major breakthrough in the study of the electronic structure of unsaturated hydrocarbons. His theoretical and experimental studies of nuclear hyperfine interactions in such compounds showed conclusively that this interaction gave a measure of the unpaired electron spin densities on the carbon atoms (see McConnell equation for details). His theoretical and experimental investigations of the anisotropic nuclear hyperfine interactions laid a firm foundation for the analysis of the paramagnetic resonance spectra of organic free radicals in. molecular crystals. His work also provided the first experimental demonstration of a negative spin density at a proton. He also realized that certain nitric oxide free radicals had the potential of providing labels for studying molecular motions. His introduction of 'spin labels' has led to a deep understanding of such motions, and to extensive applications in many biological systems of great interest. These motions include the rates of translational diffusion of lipids in bilayer membranes as well as the rates of trans membrane phospholipid "flip-flop". In fact nitric oxide free radical "spin labels" provided some of the earliest evidence for the fluidity of biological membranes.

His later research was concerned with the physical chemistry of biological membranes. These studies range all the way from lipid monolayers at the air-water interface to the regions of membrane-membrane contact that are important in immunology. An important contribution was the introduction of supported lipid bilayers to mimic cell surfaces. For example, this system was used to mimic antigen presentation whereby a specific molecule of the major histocompatibility complex is incorporated into the bilayer, a specific antigenic peptide is added, and the combined system used to stimulate a specific T - helper cell.

In 1983 McConnell founded Molecular Devices Corporation along with three former graduate students and post docs (Gillian Humphries, j. Wallace Parce and Dean Hafeman) together with a talented engineer, Calvin Chow. The company produced instrumentation for biochemical analysis and drug discovery. The company had over 1,000 employees when it was acquired in 2007. McConnell served on the board of directors between 1983 and 2007.

"The majority of the 150 scientists who worked with Harden as graduate students, postdocs, and senior colleagues, attended a symposium on April 4, 1992, at Stanford University, in celebration of Harden's 65th birthday. As an outgrowth of that symposium, these scientists organized special issues of the Biophysical Journal and The Journal of Physical Chemistry to present current aspects of their work and his. Several other scientists whose work has been influenced by McConnell's contributed articles also. The symposium and these papers provide powerful testimony to the profound impact that Harden McConnell has had in the fields of chemical physics, molecular biophysics, and cellular biophysics. McConnell's influence comes not only from his own impressive publication list, but also from the scores of scientists whose careers he has inspired, by his example of intellectual brilliance, and personal integrity." "The McConnell Book: Biographical Sketches and Memoirs of Students and Lab Associates in Celebration of Harden M. McConnell's 65th Birthday," was also published.

== Awards and honours ==
He was awarded the Wolf Prize in Chemistry in 1983/84 for "his studies of the electronic structure of molecules through paramagnetic resonance spectroscopy and for the introduction and biological applications of spin label techniques".

He has also received several awards and honours. Following are the awards and honours received by Dr. McConnell.

- California Section Award of the ACS (1961)
- National ACS Award in Pure Chemistry (1962)
- Election to the National Academy of Sciences (1965)
- Harrison Howe Award, ACS (1968)
- Irving Langmuir Award in Chemical Physics, American Chemical Society (1972)
- International Academy of Quantum Molecular Sciences (1974)?
- Elected Fellow of the American Association for the Advancement of Science (1982)
- Dickson Prize for Science, Carnegie-Mellon University (1982)
- ISCO Award (1984)
- Wolf Prize (shared with Herbert S. Gutowsky and John S. Waugh) (1984)
- Pauling Medal, Puget Sound and Oregon ACS Sections (1987)
- Wheland Medal, University of Chicago (1988)
- U.S. National Academy of Sciences Award in Chemical Sciences (1988)
- National Medal of Science (Chemistry) (1989)
- Peter Debye Award in Physical Chemistry, ACS (1990)
- Doctor of Science, University of Chicago (Honorary) (1991)
- Bruker Prize, Royal Society of Chemistry (1995)
- ACS Award in Surface Chemistry (1997)
- Serbian Academy of Sciences and Arts (1997)
- Biophysical Society Fellow (1999)
- Zavoisky Award (2000)
- Welch Award in Chemistry (2002)
- Fellow, Royal Society of Chemistry (2008)
- Fellow, International ESR/EPR Society (2014)

== Personal life ==
Harden M. McConnell was born on July 18, 1927, in Richmond, Virginia, and his interest in science, particularly chemistry, began when he discovered a box of copper sulfate crystals in the basement of his home at the approximate age of 12. He died on Wednesday, October 8, 2014 at his home in Atherton, California.
