= Gemma Solomon =

Australian chemist

- Born: 27 October 1980 (age 45)
- Education: University of Western Australia; University of Sydney
- Scientific career
- Workplaces: Northwestern University; University of Copenhagen
- Thesis: Understanding the conductance of single molecules (2006)

Gemma C. Solomon (born 27 October 1980) is an Australian chemist who is a professor at the Nanoscience Centre in the University of Copenhagen. She serves as Deputy Editor of ACS Physical Chemistry Au. Her research considers quantum interference and molecular electronics.

== Early life and education ==
Solomon was an undergraduate student at the University of Western Australia, where she studied chemical physics. She moved to the University of Sydney, where she completed a second bachelor's degree and a doctorate in chemistry. Her research considered the conductance of single molecules. She joined Northwestern University as a postdoctoral fellow in 2006, where she worked with Mark Ratner.

== Research and career ==
In 2010, Solomon joined the faculty at the University of Copenhagen, when she was awarded a starter grant from the European Research Council. Her research considers the development of novel materials for molecular electronics. In 2018, Solomon designed the most highly insulating molecule ever reported, which transformed understanding of the limits of electronic insulation. Later that year she was made a Full Professor at the university.

== Awards and honours ==
- 2014 Torkil Holm Prize
- 2016 Uppsala University Löwdin Lectureship
- 2019 Royal Danish Academy of Sciences and Letters Silver Medal
- 2021 Ministry of Higher Education and Science’s EliteForsk Prize

== Selected publications ==
- Gemma C. Solomon; Carmen Herrmann; Thorsten Hansen; Vladimiro Mujica; Mark A Ratner (7 February 2010). "Exploring local currents in molecular junctions". Nature Chemistry. 2 (3): 223–228. doi:10.1038/nchem.546. ISSN 1755-4330. PMID 21124481. Wikidata Q62067651.
- Gemma C Solomon; David Q Andrews; Thorsten Hansen; Randall H Goldsmith; Michael R Wasielewski; Richard P Van Duyne; Mark A Ratner (1 August 2008). "Understanding quantum interference in coherent molecular conduction". The Journal of Chemical Physics. 129 (5): 054701. doi:10.1063/1.2958275. ISSN 0021-9606. PMID 18698915. Wikidata Q43820979.
- Gemma C Solomon; David Q Andrews; Randall H Goldsmith; Thorsten Hansen; Michael R Wasielewski; Richard P Van Duyne; Mark A Ratner (1 December 2008). "Quantum interference in acyclic systems: conductance of cross-conjugated molecules". Journal of the American Chemical Society. 130 (51): 17301–17308. doi:10.1021/ja8044053. ISSN 0002-7863. PMID 19053483. Wikidata Q53048378.

== Personal life ==
Solomon is married to Allan Godsk Larsen, with whom she has three children.
