= Stephen Kukolich =

American physical chemist

Stephen G. Kukolich
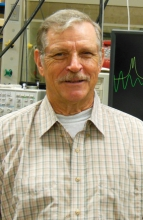
- Born: February 3, 1940 (age 86); Appleton, Wisconsin
- Education: Massachusetts Institute of Technology (MIT)
- Occupation: Professor
- Employer: University of Arizona
- Known for: High Resolution Microwave Spectroscopy, Microwave measurements of structures of transition metal complexes. Structures of weakly-bound complexes.

Stephen Kukolich, (born February 3, 1940) is an experimental physical chemist in the chemistry and biochemistry department at the University of Arizona. His primary research is high-resolution rotational spectroscopy to determine molecular structures and electronic properties of molecules and molecular complexes. The molecular spectroscopy research was published in 225 papers which were mentioned in 4300 citations (ResearchGate.) and discussed in a few. Details of citations are given by Google Scholar and Academictree. The research was funded by the NSF 11 times beginning in 1970.

== Education and career ==
He entered MIT in 1958 and graduated in physics in 1962. He continued at MIT, graduating with a Sc.D. in physics in 1966. The thesis project was on accurate measurements of ammonia hyperfine structure with a high-resolution two-cavity maser spectrometer. Ammonia microwave measurements by Kukolich were cited by P.T.P. Ho and Charles H. Townes in Annual Reviews of Astronomy and Astrophysics. The two-cavity molecular beam maser was developed at MIT. using the method of separated oscillating fields developed by Norman Ramsey. After 2 years as an instructor in physics, the following year was spent collaborating with Willis H. Flygare on molecular Zeeman effect measurements. He returned to MIT, in the chemistry department, as assistant professor in 1969. He moved to the University of Arizona, chemistry department in 1974 and became a full professor in 1979.

== Research ==
Early research yielded accurate and precise measurements of ammonia, Pyramidal inversion frequencies and hyperfine structure, using the two-cavity maser spectrometer developed at MIT. The high resolution allowed measurements of deuterium quadrupole coupling for many small molecules. Most of the published microwave structures for transition metal complexes were funded by the NSF and measured by his microwave group at the University of Arizona, and reviewed by Caminati and Grabow and Caminati. A very large cavity Balle-Flygare spectrometer was constructed at the University of Arizona, with support from the NSF. The structures for many hydrogen-bonded complexes, and other weakly-bound complexes, were determined from the microwave spectra. It was shown that some hydrogen-bonded complexes are not simply static structures by measuring the concerted proton tunneling frequency for the formic acid - propiolic acid complex in a pulsed-beam spectrometer This research has been reviewed. The doubly hydrogen bonded complexes are of interest because of the similarity to the A-T base-pairs of DNA. This work was also supported by the NSF. This microwave research is referenced 16 times by W. Gordy and R. L. Cook
