= Valeria Molinero =

Argentinian chemist and academic

- Born: Valeria Paula Molinero; 1970 (age 55–56); Argentina
- Education: University of Buenos Aires
- Awards: Member of the National Academy of Sciences (2022)
- Scientific career
- Fields: Chemistry
- Workplaces: University of Utah; California Institute of Technology; Arizona State University
- Thesis: Aspectos de equilibrio y dinámicos de solvatación en nanoagregados polares binarios (1999)
- Website: molinero.hec.utah.edu

Valeria Paula Molinero is an Argentinian physicist who is the Jack and Peg Simons Endowed Professor of Theoretical Chemistry at the University of Utah. Her research investigates the simulation of the behavior of materials. She was awarded the American Physical Society Irving Langmuir Award in Chemical Physics in 2023.

== Early life and education ==
Molinero was born in Argentina. She earned her undergraduate and doctorate degrees and was a doctoral researcher at the University of Buenos Aires, where she specialized in electrochemistry.

== Research and career ==
After her PhD, Molinero moved to the California Institute of Technology and Arizona State University for postdoctoral research, working alongside Austen Angell and William Andrew Goddard III.

In 2006, Molinero joined the University of Utah, where she built a research program focused on the use of computer simulations to understand the structure and phase dynamics of materials. Her research has mainly investigated the transition between water and ice, and how the environment in which that transition occurs (e.g. in the production of ice cream, in clouds, in anti-freeze) influences the process.

Molinero has developed simulations to understand the materials properties of zeolites, and to predict the specific polymorph from a synthesis mixture. In 2020, she investigated the smallest limits of ice, showing that in nanodroplets of fewer than 90 molecules of water it is impossible for ice to form.

=== Awards and honors ===
- 2005 International Association for the Properties of Water and Steam Helmholtz Award
- 2009 Beckman Young Investigator Award
- 2012 Camille Dreyfus Teacher-Scholar Award
- 2019 University of Utah Distinguished Scholarly and Creative Research Award
- 2019 Proceedings of the National Academy of Sciences of the United States of America Cozzarelli Prize
- 2021 Elected Fellow of the American Association for the Advancement of Science
- 2021 Elected Fellow of the American Academy of Arts and Sciences
- 2022 Elected a Member of the National Academy of Sciences
- 2022 Elected Fellow of the Utah Academy of Engineering and Sciences
- 2022 Honorary doctorate from the University of Buenos Aires
- 2023 American Physical Society Irving Langmuir Award in Chemical Physics
- 2023 Atmospheric Chemistry and Physics Outstanding Referee Award, European Geosciences Union

=== Selected publications ===
As of 2023 according to Google scholar her most cited publications are:

- Valeria Molinero; Emily B Moore (1 April 2009). "Water modeled as an intermediate element between carbon and silicon". The Journal of Physical Chemistry B. 113 (13): 4008–4016. arXiv:0809.2811. doi:10.1021/jp805227c. ISSN 1520-6106. PMID 18956896. Wikidata Q46289790.
- Emily B Moore; Valeria Molinero (23 November 2011). "Structural transformation in supercooled water controls the crystallization rate of ice". Nature. 479 (7374): 506–508. arXiv:1107.1622. doi:10.1038/nature10586. ISSN 1476-4687. PMID 22113691. Wikidata Q34235591.
- Liam C. Jacobson; Waldemar Hujo; Valeria Molinero (1 August 2010). "Amorphous Precursors in the Nucleation of Clathrate Hydrates". Journal of the American Chemical Society. 132 (33): 11806–11811. doi:10.1021/ja1051445. ISSN 0002-7863. PMID 20669949. Wikidata Q54278459.
