= Herbert S. Gutowsky =

American physical chemist

- Born: November 8, 1919; Bridgman, Michigan, U.S.
- Died: January 13, 2000 (aged 80); Urbana, Illinois, U.S.
- Education: Indiana University Bloomington (B.S.); UC-Berkeley (M.S.); Harvard University (Ph.D)
- Known for: Solid-state NMR and NMR spectroscopy
- Awards: Kistiakowsky prize Wolf Prize (1983/84); Irving Langmuir Prize (1966); Peter Debye Award (1975); Member of the National Academy of Sciences, US
- Scientific career
- Fields: Nuclear magnetic resonance
- Workplaces: University of Illinois Urbana-Champaign
- Doctoral advisor: George Kistiakowsky

Herbert Sander Gutowsky (November 8, 1919 – January 13, 2000) was an American chemist who was a professor of chemistry at the University of Illinois Urbana-Champaign. Gutowsky was the first to apply nuclear magnetic resonance (NMR) methods to the field of chemistry. He used nuclear magnetic resonance spectroscopy to determine the structure of molecules. His pioneering work developed experimental control of NMR as a scientific instrument, connected experimental observations with theoretical models, and made NMR one of the most effective analytical tools for analysis of molecular structure and dynamics in liquids, solids, and gases, used in chemical and medical research, His work was relevant to the solving of problems in chemistry, biochemistry, and materials science, and has influenced many of the subfields of more recent NMR spectroscopy.

== Birth and education ==
Herbert Sander Gutowsky was born on November 8, 1919, one of seven children of Otto and Hattie Meyer Gutowsky of Bridgman, Michigan. He credited his childhood on a produce farm with teaching him the importance of hard work. After his mother's death in the Great Depression, the family moved to Hammond, Indiana. Gutowsky attended Hammond High School and sold papers to help support the family.

Gutowsky attended Indiana University Bloomington, where he worked for three years as an undergraduate assistant to astronomer Frank K. Edmondson. Gutowsky earned his bachelor's degree in 1940. After graduation, he served in the United States Army and became a captain. He then attended the University of California, Berkeley. He obtained a master's degree in 1946, working with Kenneth Pitzer. With Pitzer, Gutowsky studied molecules whose bonds had fewer valence electrons than would be expected to fill their orbitals. Studying aluminum alkyls, Gutowsky and Pitzer described dimerization, in which two identical molecules combine to form one.

Gutowsky then attended Harvard University, where he worked with George Kistiakowsky, receiving his Ph.D. in physical chemistry in 1949. Much of his work dealt with infrared spectrophotometry, but he also became familiar with NMR, which was being used in nuclear physics for the measurement of nuclear magnetic moments. Gutowsky collaborated with George Pake, resulting in the publication of several important papers on the use of NMR to study molecular structure and motion in solids.

== Academic career ==
Gutowsky became an instructor in chemistry at the University of Illinois Urbana-Champaign in 1948, an assistant professor in 1951, an associate professor in 1955, and a full professor in 1956. He was active in researching molecular and solid-state structure, using infrared (IR) and radio frequency spectroscopy, and doing pioneering work with nuclear magnetic resonance and electron paramagnetic resonance.

He served as head of the division of physical chemistry from 1956 to 1962, and became head of the department of chemistry from 1967 to 1970. He oversaw the creation of the school of chemical sciences, which contained both the departments of chemistry and chemical engineering, and served as its founding director from 1970 to 1983. A member of the American Physical Society, he chaired its Division of Chemical Physics from 1974 to 1975.

As a research professor of chemistry at the Center for Advanced Study at the University of Illinois, Gutowsky was active as a researcher and teacher from 1983 to 2000. During this phase of his research career, he used Fourier transform microwave spectroscopy to study the activity of small, weakly bonded molecules in the gas phase.

== Research ==
The 1952 Nobel Prize for Physics was shared by physicists Felix Bloch and Edward Mills Purcell for their independent discovery of nuclear magnetic resonance. In nuclear magnetic resonance spectroscopy, a substance to be analyzed is exposed to electromagnetic radiation under controlled conditions in a magnetic field. Selected wavelengths of radiation will be absorbed by the substance depending on its chemical composition. The absorption spectrum of the material indicates the wavelengths that have been absorbed, enabling researchers to determine the molecular structure of the substance.

Gutowsky was the first to apply NMR to the field of chemistry. During his first year at the University of Illinois, he obtained funding and built his own NMR spectrometer. Gutowsky's early work included investigations into a number of areas of importance to the development and use of NMR: (1) Gutowsky used NMR to study structure and motion in solids, connecting experimental observations with theoretical models and leading to important breakthroughs in the understanding of molecular structure (2) Gutowsky determined the origin of chemical shifts. (3) Gutowsky discovered spin–spin coupling in molecular liquids and understood its implications for the study of molecular structure (4) Gutowsky used NMR to study mechanisms of chemical exchange and conformational change of molecules.

Gutowsky's work was essential both in understanding the behavior and capabilities of NMR as a scientific instrument and relating it to core concepts in chemistry. Understanding and applying NMR involved chemical, physical and electronic expertise. Gutowsky employed a variety of strategies to ensure that the observed results that he and others were obtaining with NMR were consistently described, understood, and theoretically explained. Through rigorous calculation, convergence, calibration, experimental characterization, and correlation to chemical concepts, he developed experimental control of NMR as a scientific instrument, and "connected results obtained in chemical physics to the concepts and needs of organic chemists." Requiring a high level of precision and carefully examining observed anomalies were key to Gutowsky's success in searching for the new, the unexpected, and the interesting. As Gutowsky noted, "'errors' sometimes are more important than preconceptions as to what is to be obtained in a given experiment".

By April 1950, Gutowsky and Charles J. Hoffman were able to observe proton resonance shifts for compounds containing fluorine nuclei, using both inorganic and organic samples. Gutowsky reported the discovery of resonance shifts of nuclei within a covalently bonded molecule, an effect observed by others in nitrogen compounds with ionic bonding. Comparing results from a variety of samples, Gutowsky and his group improved the accuracy of their instrument through careful procedures, checks of the instrument, repeated tests, cross-checking using other instruments and techniques, and comparisons with outside data. In September, when members of his group observed a double resonance in PF_{3} where it was not predicted, it was at first assumed that it was a result of impurities or an incomplete reaction in preparation. However, their observations held up under stringent testing, and other researchers were independently reporting related results: Walter D. Knight (Brookhaven National Laboratory), William C. Dickinson (Massachusetts Institute of Technology), and Warren Proctor and Fu Chun Yu (Stanford). Gutowsky looked to molecular structure and theory for explanations of what became known as "chemical shift".

"Chemists learn very early to look for periodicities in the chemical and physical properties of compounds, or they don't stay in chemistry very long... it seemed to me that the chemical shift, as an electronic phenomenon, should be related in some way to the nature of the chemical bonds. This in turn depends upon the nature of the atoms bonded together."

Beginning with simple binary fluorides, Gutowsky and his group began comprehensive testing of organic fluorides. Gutowsky is credited with recognizing that a new phenomenon was involved, that could not be fully explained by previous theories. By 1953, Lee Meyer, Apollo Saika, and Gutowsky were able to associate the chemical shift of protons with functional groups within molecules. Based on the study of 220 organic compounds, they presented a chart relating proton chemical shifts to groups of atoms, work that positioned NMR as a tool suited to structural research in organic chemistry. In addition, Apollo Saika and Illinois physicist Charles Pence Slichter used correlations between the electronegativity of atoms bound to fluorine and the chemical shift data from the group's fluorine research, to simplify the formula originally proposed for the chemical shift by quantum physicist Norman Ramsey at Harvard.

Meanwhile, Gutowsky, McCall and Slichter's 1951 paper, "Coupling among Nuclear Magnetic Dipoles in Molecules", reported the first observation of spin–spin couplings in liquids. Gutowsky and his group had initially assumed that their 1950s observations of double resonance lines were accidental, but re-examined their work after Proctor & Yu at Stanford also reported anomalies. By March 1951, Gutowsky's group were examining fluoro-chloro compounds of known purity and predicting the occurrence of resonance lines: for example, POCl_{3} showed a single resonance line, while POCl_{2}F showed a doublet. Gutowsky, McCall and Slichter related the intensities of lines to their binomial coefficients, proposing what turned out to be a correct explanation for such couplings, and suggesting a simple predictive rule that became a basis for further structural research. Other papers rapidly followed, in which they critiqued and expanded their initial interpretation. Some of the work was carried out in close collaboration with Erwin Hahn and others at Stanford, and theoretical elaborations of the coupling mechanism were proposed by Ramsey and Purcell, and supported by Gutowsky's experimental work.

As a result of their work it became clear that "The chemical shift is observed whenever two or more nuclei of the same isotopic species have a different environment, a separate resonance absorption usually being observed for each distinct group with an intensity proportional to the number of nuclei in the group. Nuclei may be magnetically different because either they are in chemically distinct groups or they have a different spatial environment."

Gutowsky's careful attention to anomalies, and the insistence that they be explained, led to the discovery of a further mechanism, the exchange of molecular groups, named chemical exchange. He early postulated that multiplets observed with acids in aqueous solutions might collapse into a single line as a result of increased exchange rates. However, it was difficult to find molecular systems whose exchange rate could be monitored precisely enough to observe this. The rate equations of Gutowsky, McCall, and Slichter (1951) were used by Gutowsky and Saika to investigate proton exchange in aqueous electrolyte solutions. They were able to apply the theory to more than two sites and calculate the predicted collapse of the multiplet structure as the rate of exchange increased. However, they were unable to present cases in which the actual collapse was observable. Gutowsky and Charles H. Holm studied intramolecular rotational rates of amides, establishing that energy barriers existed between molecular conformations. They were able to demonstrate that molecules "jumped" between states as a result of increases in temperature. Given enough energy, all forms of a molecules could jump to the highest possible state, and any multiplets in the magnetic resonance signal would converge. This work initiated a new research area in which NMR was used to study the dynamics of molecules. Realizing that NMR spectra were modified as a result of chemical exchanges enabled researchers to measure exchange rates and study exchange processes in a way that had not previously been possible. Gutowsky and Adam Allerhand later attempted to improve the experimental rigor of methods for studying chemical exchange.

Quiet, kind and thoughtful, Gutowsky focused on science and worked very closely with all his research associates. One of his graduate students later commented, "Herb was with us round the clock and always supportive. He let us think that we had some of the best ideas, but on reflection we knew where they came from."

During the 1970s Gutowsky became increasingly involved in administrative work and spent less time on research. Nonetheless, he explored the use of NMR in complex biological systems by working with Eric Oldfield on protein-lipid interactions in membranes. He also collaborated with Govindjee and his photosynthesis research group in Biophysics during 1976–1986, using NMR, fluorescence, and pulsed light/oxygen to study the evolution of biomembranes and investigate the physico-chemical mechanisms of photosynthesis.

After the early death of his friend Willis H. Flygare in 1981, Gutowsky established a second research career, extending Flygare's work with Fourier transform spectroscopy. Gutowsky's group examined the rotational spectra of weakly bound molecules in the gas phase, and was the first to use this method to study trimers, tetramers, and pentamers. He established the length of the silicon–carbon double bond and the rotational spectrum of the benzene dimer.

== Awards and honors ==
Herbert Gutowsky was awarded the Wolf Prize in Chemistry in 1983/84 for "his pioneering work in the development and applications of nuclear magnetic resonance spectroscopy in chemistry". More specifically, the prize committee cited explicitly his truly outstanding physical chemistry research results as follows:

"Professor Herbert S. Gutowsky was the first to apply the nuclear magnetic resonance method to chemical research. His experimental and theoretical work on the chemical shift effect and its relation to molecular structure has provided the chemist with working tools to study molecular conformation and molecular interactions in solutions. Gutowsky's pioneering work on the spin–spin coupling effect developed this phenomenon into a 'finger print' method for the identification and characterization of organic compounds. He was also the first to observe the effect of dynamic processes on the lineshape of high resolution nuclear magnetic resonance spectra, and exploited it for the studies of hindered rotation in molecules, Simultaneously with others he discovered the effect of the scalar and dipole-dipole interaction with unpaired electrons in solutions of paramagnetic ions."

Gutowsky's many awards and honors include the following:

- 1960, Member of the National Academy of Sciences
- 1966, Irving Langmuir Award in Chemical Physics, American Chemical Society
- 1969, Fellow of the American Academy of Arts and Sciences
- 1974, Medal of the International Society of Magnetic Resonance
- 1976, National Medal of Science
- 1982, Member of the American Philosophical Society
- 1984, Wolf Prize in Chemistry
- 1991, Chemical Pioneer Award, American Institute of Chemists
- 1992, Pittsburgh Spectroscopy Award, Spectroscopy Society of Pittsburgh, Pittsburgh Conference on Analytical Chemistry and Applied Spectroscopy
- 2002, The Noyes Laboratory at the University of Illinois, where Gutowsky and others worked, was designated as a National Historic Chemical Landmark by the American Chemical Society.
- 2016, Citation for Chemical Breakthrough Award from the Division of History of Chemistry of the American Chemical Society

In addition to awards received during his lifetime, Gutowsky's contributions have been recognized posthumously. The laboratory where he and others worked was recognized as a National Historic Chemical Landmark by the American Chemical Society in 2002. Gutowsky's 1951 publication entitled "Coupling among Nuclear Magnetic Dipoles in Molecules", the first observation of spin–spin couplings in liquids, was a crucial step in transforming NMR spectroscopy into one of the most powerful tools in chemical science. The importance of this publication was recognized with a Citation for Chemical Breakthrough Award from the Division of History of Chemistry of the American Chemical Society, presented to the University of Illinois in 2016.

== Personal ==
Gutowsky was an avid bicyclist in his early life, and also a bird-watcher. He later became very interested in growing roses in his own garden. He was married twice, in 1949 to Barbara Stuart with whom he had three sons, and in 1982 to Virginia Warner. He had diabetes and Parkinson's disease. Gutowsky died on January 13, 2000, in Urbana, Illinois.

== See also ==
- Carbon-13 NMR
- Deuterium NMR
- Dynamic nuclear polarisation
- In vivo magnetic resonance spectroscopy
- J-coupling
- Knight shift
- NMR spectra database
- NMR spectroscopy
- Relaxation (physics)
- Solid-state nuclear magnetic resonance
