= Jack H. Freed =

American physical chemist (born 1938)

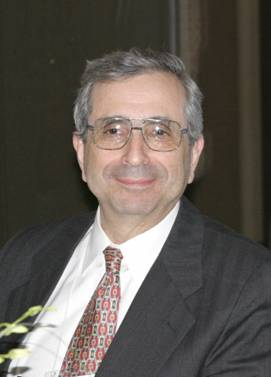
- Born: April 19, 1938 (age 88); New York City, US
- Education: Yale University (AB); Columbia University (PhD)
- Known for: Electron Paramagnetic Resonance (aka Electron Spin Resonance)
- Awards: ACS Buck-Whitney Award; E. Bright Wilson Award in Spectroscopy (2008); Irving Langmuir Award (1997); International ESR Society Gold Medal
- Scientific career
- Fields: Chemistry
- Workplaces: Cornell University
- Doctoral advisor: George K. Fraenkel
- Website: acert.cornell.edu

Jack Herschel Freed (born April 19, 1938) is an American chemist known for his pioneering work in electron paramagnetic resonance (aka electron spin resonance) spectroscopy. He is the Frank and Robert Laughlin Professor of Physical Chemistry, emeritus, at Cornell University.

== Biography ==
Jack Freed was born in New York City. He received his bachelor's degree in chemical engineering in 1958 from Yale University and his Ph.D. in chemistry in 1962 from Columbia University.

Freed is currently the Frank and Robert Laughlin Professor of Physical Chemistry, emeritus, in the department of chemistry and chemical biology at Cornell University. In 2001, Freed founded the National Biomedical Center for Advanced Electron Spin Resonance Technology (ACERT) funded by National Institutes of Health and has been its director since then. In 2004, he was an editor for Journal of Physical Chemistry. Before that he was a fellow in numerous places such as Alfred P. Sloan Foundation, American Academy of Arts and Sciences, American Physical Society, John Simon Guggenheim Memorial Foundation, Hebrew University Institute for Advanced Studies, and Weizmann Institute of Science.

In 2023, he received two grants totalling $7.8 million over five years from the National Institutes of Health to use electron-spin resonance (ESR) for the benefit of public health. Located in Baker Lab on Cornell’s Ithaca campus, this national resource will provide cutting-edge ESR spectroscopy for biomedical researchers engaged in projects aimed at understanding and combating diseases and ailments. The resource is the only one in the U.S of its kind.

== Honors and awards ==
External videos
- “A Conversation with Jack H. Freed”, Cornell University, 2012.
- "ACERT, Cornell University – Facilitating Modern Biochemistry, Biomedical and Biophysics Research", Biophysical Society TV, 2014.

- Fellow of the A. P. Sloan Foundation, 1966
- Senior fellow of the Weizmann Institute of Science, 1970
- Fellow of the American Physical Society, 1976
- Buck-Whitney Award in Pure and Applied Chemistry by American Chemical Society, 1981
- Bruker Award in Electron Spin Resonance by the Royal Society of Chemistry, 1990
- Fellow of the American Academy of Arts and Sciences, 1994
- Gold Medal by International EPR/ESR Society, 1994
- Irving Langmuir Prize in Chemical Physics by the American Physical Society, 1997
- International Zavoisky Award by the Russian Academy of Sciences, 1998
- Honorary member of the National Magnetic Society of India, 2001
- Special J.H. Freed Festschrift Issue by the Journal of Physical Chemistry on his 65th birthday, 2004
- Fellow of the International Society of Magnetic Resonance, 2008
- E. Bright Wilson Award in Spectroscopy by the American Chemical Society, 2008
- Fellow of the Royal Society of Chemistry, 2009
- Fellow of the American Association for the Advancement of Science, 2009
- ISMAR Prize by the International Society of Magnetic Resonance, 2013
- Joel Henry Hildebrand Award in the Chemistry of Liquids by the American Chemical Society, 2014
- Fellow of the International EPR/ESR Society, 2017
