= A. Welford Castleman Jr. =

American physicist and chemist

Albert Welford Castleman Jr. (January 7, 1936 – February 28, 2017) was an American physicist and chemist who was the Eberly Family Distinguished Chair of Science at Eberly College of Science, Pennsylvania State University. He was elected member of the National Academy of Sciences and fellow of the American Academy of Arts and Sciences, both in 1998. In 2010, Castleman was awarded the Irving Langmuir Award.
