= Irving Langmuir Award =

Annual award in chemistry and physics

The Irving Langmuir Prize in Chemical Physics is awarded annually, in even years by the American Chemical Society and in odd years by the American Physical Society. The award is meant to recognize and encourage outstanding interdisciplinary research in chemistry and physics, in the spirit of Irving Langmuir. A nominee must have made an outstanding contribution to chemical physics or physical chemistry within the 10 years preceding the year in which the award is made. The award will be granted without restriction, except that the recipient must be a resident of the United States.

The award was established in 1931 by Dr. A.C. Langmuir, brother of Nobel Prize-winning chemist Irving Langmuir, to recognize the best young chemist in the United States. A $10,000 prize was to be awarded annually by the American Chemical Society. The first recipient was Linus Pauling. In 1964, the General Electric Foundation took over the financial backing of the prize, which was renamed the Irving Langmuir Award and the modern selection process was created. In 2006 the GE Global Research took over sponsorship of the award, and since 2009 the award has been co-sponsored between GE Global Research and the ACS Division of Physical Chemistry.

== Past recipients ==
Source: American Physical Society and American Chemical Society

- 1931 Linus Pauling
- 1932 Oscar K. Rice
- 1933 Frank Spedding
- 1936 John Gamble Kirkwood
- 1965 John H. Van Vleck
- 1966 Herbert S. Gutowsky
- 1967 John C. Slater
- 1968 Henry Eyring
- 1969 Charles P. Slichter
- 1970 John A. Pople
- 1971 Michael E. Fisher
- 1972 Harden M. McConnell
- 1973 Peter M. Rentzepis
- 1974 Harry G. Drickamer
- 1975 Robert H. Cole
- 1976 John S. Waugh
- 1977 Aneesur Rahman
- 1978 Rudolph A. Marcus
- 1979 Donald S. McClure
- 1980 William A. Klemperer
- 1981 Willis H. Flygare
- 1982 Benjamin Widom
- 1983 Dudley R. Herschbach
- 1984 Robert W. Zwanzig
- 1985 Richard N. Zare
- 1986 Sidney W. Benson
- 1987 Martin Karplus
- 1988 Richard B. Bernstein
- 1989 Frank H. Stillinger
- 1990 William H. Miller
- 1991 Richard E. Smalley
- 1992 John Ross
- 1993 J. David Litster
- 1994 Robert G. Parr
- 1995 George B. Benedek
- 1996 William Carl Lineberger
- 1997 Jack H. Freed
- 1998 Alexander Pines
- 1999 Daniel Kivelson
- 2000 Richard J. Saykally
- 2001 Louis E. Brus
- 2002 Mostafa A. El-Sayed
- 2003 Phaedon Avouris
- 2004 Mark A. Ratner
- 2005 David Chandler
- 2006 F. Fleming Crim, Jr.
- 2007 Gabor A. Somorjai
- 2008 Daniel M. Neumark
- 2009 William E. Moerner
- 2010 A. Welford Castleman Jr.
- 2011 Stephen Leone
- 2012 James L. Skinner
- 2013 Wilson Ho
- 2014 Mark A. Johnson
- 2015 Jens K. Norskov
- 2016 George C. Schatz
- 2017 Emily A. Carter
- 2019 Devarajan (Dave) Thirumalai
- 2021 Jacob Klein
- 2022 Heather C. Allen
- 2023 Valeria Molinero
- 2024 David Beratan
- 2025 Sharon Glotzer

== See also ==
- List of physics awards
- List of chemistry awards
