= Yu-Shan Lin =

Taiwanese chemist

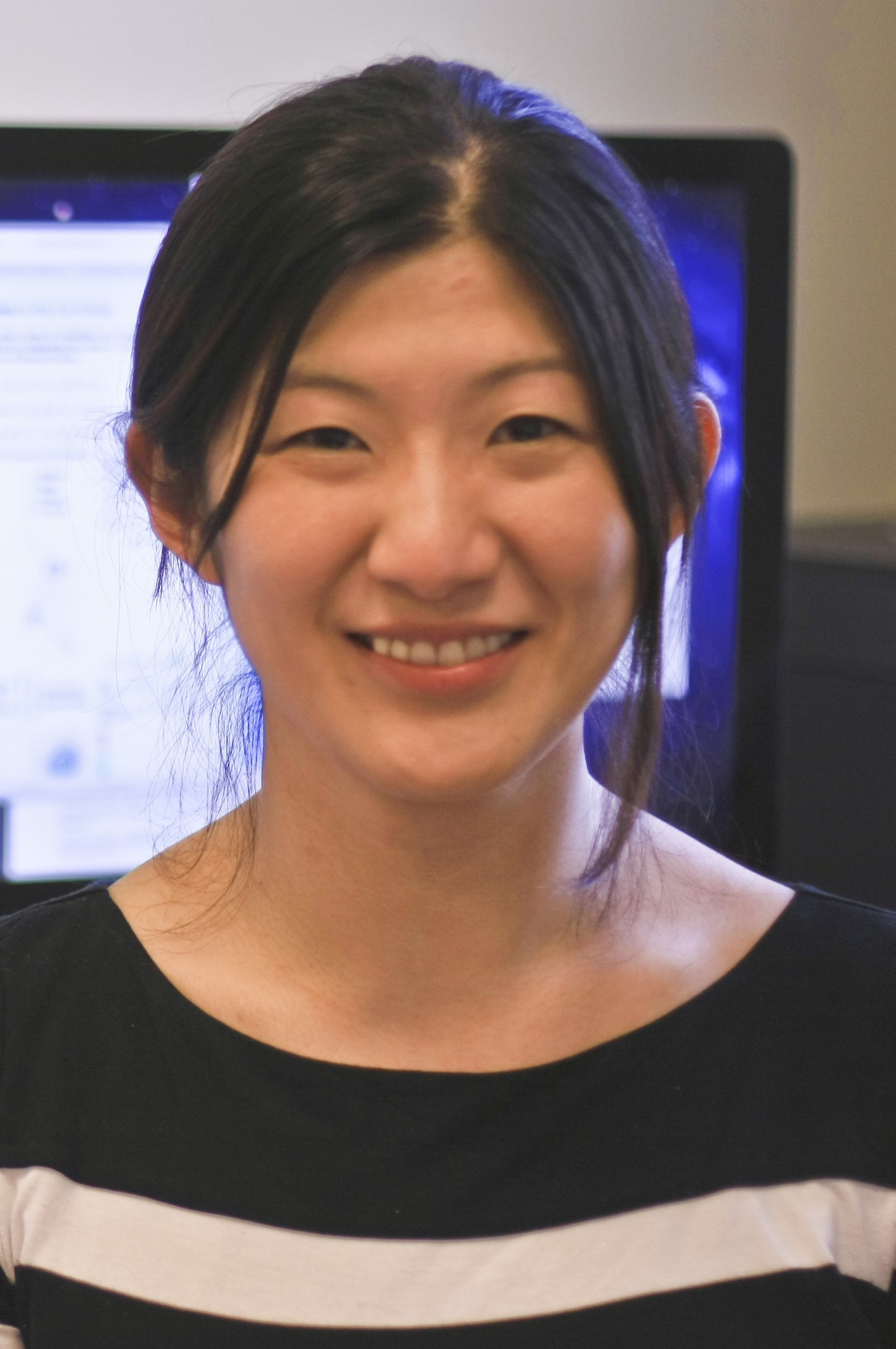
- Education: National Taiwan University (BS); University of Wisconsin, Madison (PhD)
- Scientific career
- Fields: Computational Chemistry
- Workplaces: Tufts University
- Doctoral advisor: James L. Skinner
- Other academic advisors: Vijay S. Pande (postdoctoral)
- Website: https://ase.tufts.edu/chemistry/lin/index.html

Yu-Shan Lin is a computational chemist. She is a professor and chair of the Department of Chemistry at Tufts University in the United States. Her research lab uses computational chemistry to understand and design biomolecules, with topics focusing on cyclic peptides, protein folding, and collagen.

== Education ==
Lin received her BS in chemistry from National Taiwan University in 2004. Lin received her PhD in chemistry in 2009 from University of Wisconsin, Madison, under the guidance of James L. Skinner. She then moved to Stanford, where she was a Bio-X postdoctoral fellow in the lab of Vijay S. Pande. In 2012, Lin joined the Department of Chemistry at Tufts University and received tenure in 2018. In 2024, Lin was appointed to a full professorship and became chair of the department.

== Research ==
=== Cyclic peptides ===
Lin and her lab use computational chemistry to provide information on the solution structures of cyclic peptides. They recently successfully used molecular dynamics simulation with enhanced sampling methods to design well-structured cyclic peptides.

=== Protein folding ===
Lin and her lab are interested in understanding how co- and post-translational modifications and non-natural amino acids impact protein folding. They also work on understanding the effects of amino acid substitutions during evolution on protein stability, folding, and interaction.

=== Collagen ===
Lin and her lab use molecular dynamics simulations to understand how the structure, stability, and interactions of collagen are perturbed by Gly to Ser substitutions, a very common type of Gly missense mutations in patients with Osteogenesis Imperfecta (OI), and Ser phosphorylation. Their results suggest a new possible mechanism underlying OI pathology, specifically that mutations may significantly disrupt the triple-helical structure of collagen and render it susceptible to non-collagenase proteolytic enzymes.

== Awards and honors ==
- Machine Learning in the Chemical Sciences & Engineering Award, Camille and Henry Dreyfus Foundation, 2020
- 2015: OpenEye Outstanding Junior Faculty Award in Computational Chemistry, American Chemical Society
