= Michael R. Wasielewski =

American physical chemist

- Born: Michael Roman Wasielewski; United States
- Education: University of Chicago
- Known for: Physical Chemistry, Photochemistry
- Scientific career
- Fields: Chemistry
- Workplaces: Northwestern University
- Doctoral advisor: Leon Stock

Michael Roman Wasielewski is an American physical chemist. He is currently the Clare Hamilton Hall Professor of Chemistry, Director of the Center for Molecular Quantum Transduction (CMQT), and Director of the Institute for Quantum Information Research and Engineering (INQUIRE) at Northwestern University.

Wasielewski is known for his research on light-driven charge transfer and transport in molecules and materials, photosynthesis, nanoscale materials for solar energy conversion, spin dynamics of multi-spin molecules, molecular materials for optoelectronics and quantum information science, and time-resolved optical and electron paramagnetic resonance spectroscopy.

== Education and early life ==
Wasielewski was born on the South Side of Chicago, Illinois, and spent his formative years in close proximity to both the University of Chicago and Chicago's steel making industry. He studied chemistry at University of Chicago under the direction of Leon Stock (B.S. 1971, Ph.D. 1975). His graduate research revealed how the electron-nuclear hyperfine splittings of hydrogen, carbon-13, and fluorine atoms depend on the structure of the paramagnetic molecules. After the completion of his Ph.D., Wasielewski studied antiaromaticity under the direction of Ronald Breslow at Columbia University.

== The Wasielewski Group ==
Wasielewski joined Northwestern University in 1994. During his time at Northwestern, Wasielewski has collaborated extensively with his colleagues Mark Ratner, Tobin Marks, Fred Lewis, Fraser Stoddart, and others to study molecular charge transfer and photophysics. Currently, the Wasielewski group is organized into two teams:

- Solar Energy Conversion
- Quantum Information Science

== Awards and recognition ==
- Andreas Albrecht Lecturer, Cornell University, 2025
- Edinburgh Lecturer, Duke University, 2025
- Royal Society of Chemistry, Faraday Lectureship Prize, 2022
- Hinshelwood Lecturer, University of Oxford, 2022
- Visiting Fellow, St. Catherine’s College, University of Oxford, 2022
- Inaugural Guilford Jones Lecturer, Boston University, 2022
- Bergman Lecturer, University of California, Berkeley, 2021
- Member, National Academy of Sciences, 2021
- Bruker Prize in EPR Spectroscopy, Royal Society of Chemistry, 2021
- Josef Michl American Chemical Society Award in Photochemistry, 2020
- XingDa Lecturer, Peking University, 2019
- Silver Medal in Chemistry, International EPR Society, 2018
- Physical Organic Chemistry Award, Royal Society of Chemistry, 2017
- Fellow, American Academy of Arts and Sciences, 2016
- American Institute of Chemists, Chemical Pioneer Award, 2016
- Honda-Fujishima Lectureship Award, Japanese Photochemistry Association, 2015
- Swiss Chemical Society Lectureship, 2015
- Fellow, Royal Society of Chemistry, UK, 2014
- Royal Society of Chemistry Environment Award, 2013
- Humboldt Research Award, Alexander von Humboldt Foundation, 2013
- Arthur C. Cope Scholar Award, American Chemical Society, 2012
- R. Stephen Berry Lecturer, Telluride Science Center, 2010
- Frontiers of Chemistry Lecturer, Case Western Reserve University, 2010
- Clare Hamilton Hall Endowed Chair, Northwestern University, 2010
- Hutchison Lecturer, University of Rochester, 2009
- Kaufman Lecturer, University of Pittsburgh, 2008
- The Porter Medal for Photochemistry, 2008
- Eminent Scholar Lecturer, University of Arizona, 2007
- James Flack Norris Award in Physical Organic Chemistry, American Chemical Society, 2006
- Closs Lecturer, University of Chicago, 2005
- I-APS Photochemistry Research Award, Inter-American Photochemical Society, 2004
- Pederson Lecturer, Dupont, Inc., 2003
- Weissberger-Williams Lecturer, Eastman Kodak Company, 2001
- W. Heinlen Hall Lecturer, Bowling Green State University, 1999
- R&D 100 Award (sponsored by R&D Magazine) for work in photorefractivity, 1996
- Fellow of the American Association for the Advancement of Science, 1995
- Holland Research School for Molecular Chemistry Lecturer, 1995
- R&D 100 Award (sponsored by R&D Magazine) for work in molecular switches, 1993
- Argonne Pacesetter Award, 1993
- W. E. Heraeus Foundation Fellow, University of Stuttgart, 1992
- Inaugural Lecturer, Center for Photomolecular Sciences, Imperial College of Science, Technology, and Medicine, London, 1991
- Nodzu Memorial Lecturer, Kyoto University, 1991
- University of Chicago Award for Distinguished Performance at Argonne National Laboratory, 1989
- Elizabeth R. Norton Prize for Excellence in Research in Chemistry at the University of Chicago, 1975
- Fannie and John Hertz Foundation Fellow, 1972 1974
