= McConnell equation =

In physical chemistry, the McConnell equation gives the probability of an unpaired electron in an in aromatic radical compound (such as benzene radical anion $C_6H_6^-$) being on a particular atom. It relates this probability, known as the "spin density", to its proportional dependence on the hyperfine splitting constant.

The equation is $a = Q \rho,$ where $a$ is the hyperfine splitting constant, $\rho$ is the spin density, and $Q$ is an empirical constant that can range from 2.0 to 2.5 mT.

== History ==
The equation is named after Harden M. McConnell of Stanford University, who first presented it in 1956.
