= Mary Van Rensselaer Buell =

American biochemist, working in nutrition and physiological chemistry

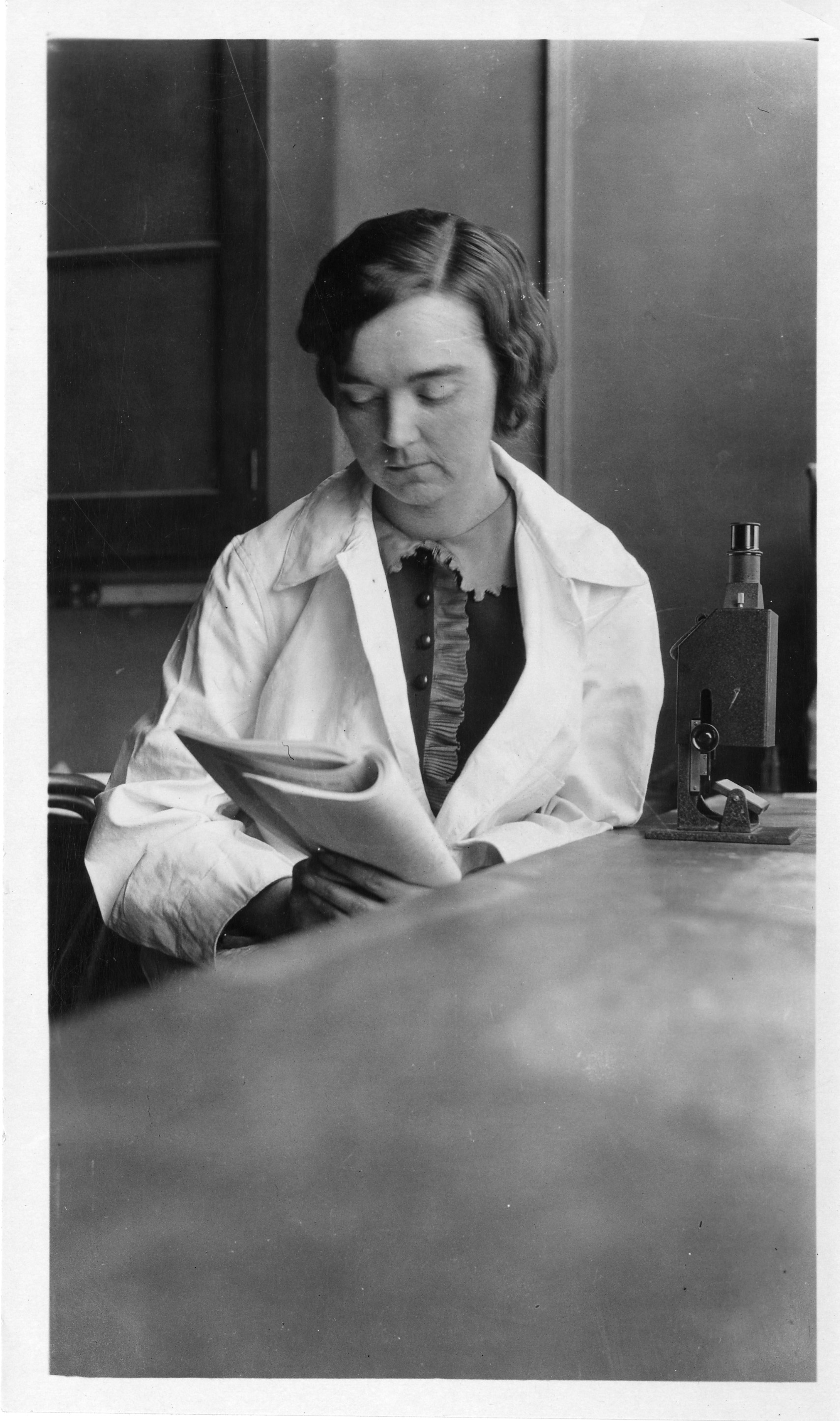
- Born: June 14, 1893; Madison, Wisconsin, U.S.
- Died: February 18, 1969 (aged 75); Madison, Wisconsin, U.S.
- Education: University of Wisconsin
- Scientific career
- Fields: Nutrition and physiological chemistry
- Workplaces: University of Wisconsin, University of Iowa, Johns Hopkins School of Medicine, Washington University School of Medicine, University of Chicago

Mary Van Rensselaer Buell (June 14, 1893 – February 18, 1969) was the first woman to earn a Ph.D. in biochemistry at the University of Wisconsin. She carried on extensive research in nutrition and physiological chemistry at the University of Wisconsin, University of Iowa, Johns Hopkins University, Washington University in St. Louis, and the University of Chicago.

== Early life and education ==
Mary Van Rensselaer Buell was born in Madison, Wisconsin, on June 14, 1893, daughter of Martha (Merry) and Charles Edwin Buell. Her father was a lawyer, and her mother was a prominent clubwoman and Cornell University alumna. Mary was one of four sisters; her sister Martha married geophysicist Louis B. Slichter. At the University of Wisconsin she earned a B.A. in chemistry in 1914, an M.A. in agricultural chemistry in 1915, and a Ph.D. in biochemistry in 1919. She was a Kappa Alpha Theta, Phi Beta Kappa, and Sigma Xi.

== Work ==
Mary Van Rensselaer Buell was a member of the American Society of Biological Chemists and carried out extensive research on nutrition and physiological chemistry at University of Iowa, Johns Hopkins University, Washington University in St. Louis, and the University of Chicago. She worked on the chemistry of nucleic acids and nucleotides, the relation of hormones to the metabolism of carbohydrates, and the development of ultramicroscopic procedures for the analysis of enzyme activity.

Buell was an assistant in general chemistry at the University of Illinois (1915–1916) and an instructor at the University of Wisconsin (1917–1919). She was an instructor in physical chemistry from 1919 to 1920, and she served as an assistant professor of Home Economics at the University of Iowa from 1920 to 1921.

She was listed among the faculty at the Johns Hopkins School of Medicine in Baltimore, MD, as an assistant professor (1921–1922), and then as an associate professor in the Department of Physiological Chemistry of the School of Medicine (1922–1930). She worked with the department of medicine from 1930 to 1946.

In 1948, Buell began the first of two appointments at the University of Wisconsin Enzyme Institute, where she was a research associate from 1948 to 1950. She went from there to Washington University School of Medicine (1950–1954), and then to the Pritzker School of Medicine (1954–1957), where she became a professor of biochemistry (1957–1960). Upon her "retirement" in 1960, she returned to work at the University of Wisconsin's Enzyme Institute.

Buell died in 1969, leaving behind an estate valued at $290,637.
