= Supramolecular electronics =

Field of chemistry

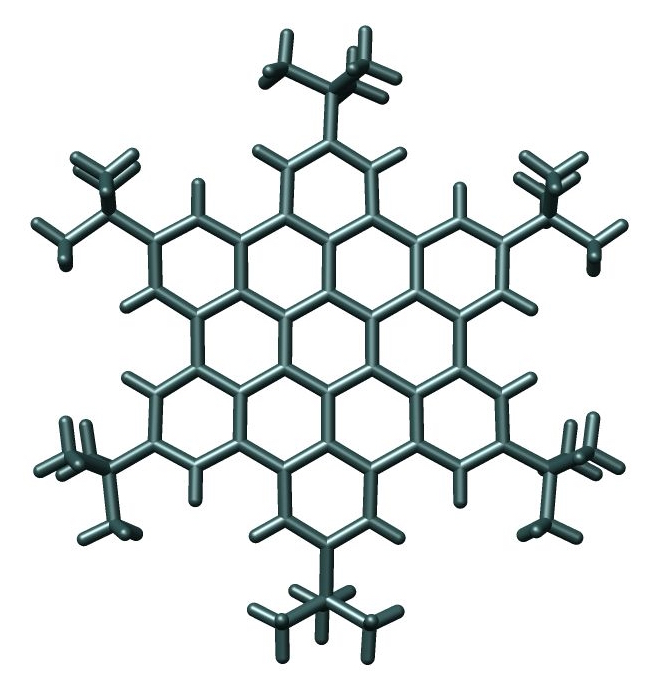
Crystal structure of a hexa-tert-butyl-hexa-peri-hexabenzocoronene reported by Müllen and coworkers in Chem. Eur. J., 2000, pp. 1834–1839

Supramolecular electronics is the experimental field of supramolecular chemistry that bridges the gap between molecular electronics and bulk plastics in the construction of electronic circuitry at the nanoscale. In supramolecular electronics, assemblies of pi-conjugated systems on the 5 to 100 nanometer scale are prepared by molecular self-assembly with the aim to fit these structures between electrodes. With single molecules as researched in molecular electronics at the 5 nanometer scale this would be impractical. Nanofibers can be prepared from polymers such as polyaniline and polyacetylene. Chiral oligo(p-phenylenevinylene)s self-assemble in a controlled fashion into (helical) wires. An example of actively researched compounds in this field are certain coronenes.
