= Louis B. Slichter =

Louis Giga Bryne Slichter
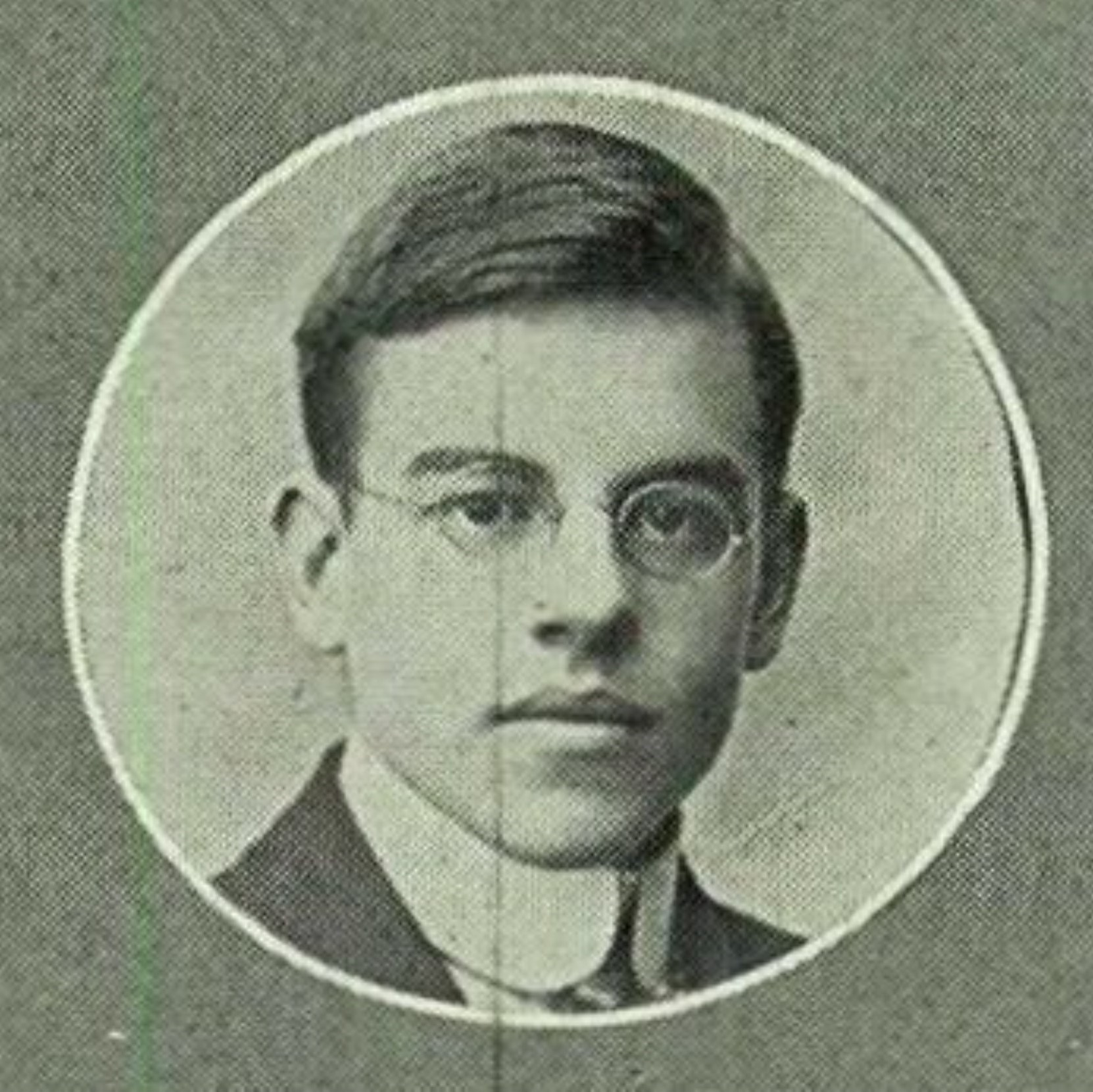
- Born: May 19, 1896; Madison, Wisconsin
- Died: March 25, 1978 (aged 81); Los Angeles, California
- Burial place: Forest Hill Cemetery

Academic background
- Education: University of Wisconsin–Madison

Louis Byrne Slichter (May 19, 1896 – March 25, 1978) was an American physicist and geophysicist who directed the Institute of Geophysics at UCLA.

Slichter was notable for, among other things, earth tides research, submarine detection, development of three-component short-period seismographs, studies of the earth temperature distribution, and the invention of a number of important geophysical devices. Slichter Foreland peninsula in Antarctica is named after him. The Institute of Geophysics building in UCLA where he used to work as a director of the Institute has been named Slichter Hall. He was a member of the National Academy of Sciences and the chair of the Academy's Geophysics Section. He was also a fellow of the American Academy of Arts and Sciences, a fellow of the American Physical Society, and a fellow of the American Geophysical Union. The New York Times called Slichter a "widely honored pioneer in the earth sciences". The National Academy of Sciences called him "one of the foremost geophysicists of the twentieth century, an outstanding leader, scholar, and teacher". UCLA called him "the world leader in the analysis of the solid earth tides".

== Family ==
Louis Slichter was the son of the mathematician Charles S. Slichter, brother of economist Sumner Slichter, and uncle of physicist Charles P. Slichter. His sister-in-law was the biochemist Mary Van Rensselaer Buell.

== Chronology ==
- May 19, 1896 born in Madison, Wisconsin
- 1917: BA, University of Wisconsin–Madison
- 1920: AM, University of Wisconsin–Madison
- 1922: PhD in physics, University of Wisconsin–Madison
- 1932–1945: Massachusetts Institute of Technology, Professor of Geophysics
- 1944: elected to the National Academy of Sciences
- 1945–1947: University of Wisconsin–Madison, Professor of Geophysics
- 1946 Presidential Certificate of Merit (1946)
- 1946 Rockefeller Foundation Fellowship
- 1947 Director of the Institute of Geophysics, Professor of Geophysics, UCLA
- 1959 an honorary life membership in the Society of Exploration Geophysicists
- 1960 the Jackling Award of the American Institute of Mining and Metallurgical Engineers
- 1960 the chair of Geophysics Section at the National Academy of Sciences
- 1963-1978 Professor Emeritus, UCLA
- 1966 Dedication of Slichter Hall at UCLA
- 1967 Honorary D.Sc., University of Wisconsin
- 1966 the William Bowie Medal of the American Geophysical Union
- 1969 Honorary LL.D., UCLA
- March 25, 1978 dies Los Angeles Medical Center at UCLA
