= Molecular conductance =

Physical quantity

Molecular Conductance ($G=I/V$), or the conductance of a single molecule, is a physical quantity in molecular electronics. Molecular conductance is dependent on the surrounding conditions (e.g. pH, temperature, pressure), as well as the properties of the measuring device. Many experimental techniques have been developed in an attempt to measure this quantity directly, but theorists and experimentalists still face many challenges.

Recently, a great deal of progress has been made in the development of reliable conductance-measuring techniques. These techniques can be divided into two categories: molecular film experiments, which measure groups of tens of molecules, and single-molecule-measuring experiments.

== Molecular film experiments ==
Molecular film experiments generally consist of the sandwiching of a thin layer of molecules between two electrodes which are used to measure the conductance through the layer. Two of the most successful implementations of this concept have been the bulk electrode approach and in the use of nanoelectrodes. In the bulk electrode approach, a molecular film is typically immobilized onto one electrode and an upper electrode is brought into contact with it allowing for a measure of current flow as a function of applied bias voltage. The nanoelectrode class of experiments, in creatively utilizing equipment such as atomic force microscope tips and small-radius wires, are able to perform the same sorts of current versus applied bias measurements but on a much smaller number of molecules as compared to bulk electrode. For instance, the tip of an atomic force microscope can be used as a top electrode and, given the nano-scale radius of curvature of the tip, the number of molecules measured is drastically cut. The difficulties encountered in these experiments have come mainly in dealing with such thin layers of molecules which often results in problems with short-circuiting the electrodes.

== Single-molecule-measurement ==
A molecule covalently connected to two electrodes.

More recently, single-molecule-measurement experiments have been developed that are bringing experimenters a better look at molecular conductance. These fall under the categories of scanning probe, which involves fixed electrode, and mechanically formed junction techniques. One example of a mechanically formed junction experiment involves using a movable electrode to make contact with and then pull away from an electrode surface coated with a single layer of molecules. As the electrode is removed from the surface, the molecules that had bonded between the two electrodes begin to detach until eventually one molecule is connected. The atomic-level geometry of the tip-electrode contact has an effect on the conductance and can change from one run of the experiment to the next, so a histogram approach is required. Forming a junction in which the precise contact geometry is known has been one of the main difficulties with this approach.

== Applications ==
An important first step toward the goal of building electronic devices on the molecular level is the ability to measure and control the electric current through an individual molecule. Based on the anticipated continuation of Moore's Law, which is expected to carry the miniaturization of transistors on integrated circuits into the atomic scale within the next 10 to 20 years, this goal of single-molecule-level circuit design is likely to become widespread throughout the semiconductor industry.

Other applications focus on the insight provided by these experiments in the area of charge transport, which is a recurrent phenomenon in many chemical and biological processes. This sort of insight gives researchers the ability to read the chemical information stored in a single molecule electronically, which can then be used in a wide variety of chemical and biosensor applications.
