= Unimolecular rectifier =

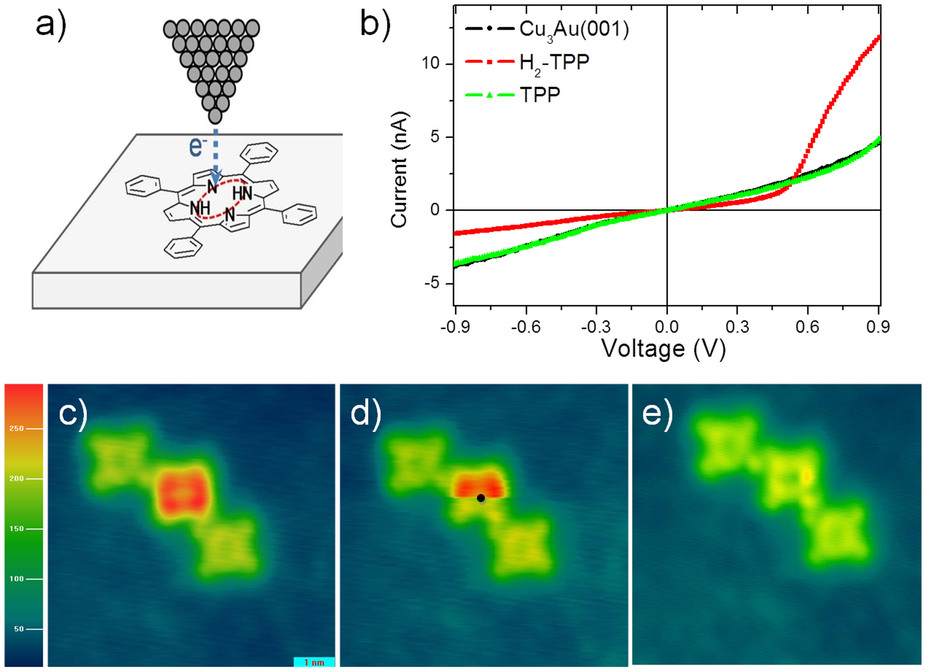
Hydrogen can be removed from individual H_{2}TPP molecules by applying excess voltage to the tip of a scanning tunneling microscope (STAM, a); this removal alters the current-voltage (I-V) curves of TPP molecules, measured using the same STM tip, from diode-like (red curve in b) to resistor-like (green curve). Image (c) shows a row of TPP, H_{2}TPP and TPP molecules. While scanning image (d), excess voltage was applied to H_{2}TPP at the black dot, which instantly removed hydrogen, as shown in the bottom part of (d) and in the re-scan image (e).

A unimolecular rectifier is a single organic molecule which functions as a rectifier (one-way conductor) of electric current. The idea was first proposed in 1974 by Arieh (later Ari) Aviram, then at IBM, and Mark Ratner, then at New York University. Their publication was the first serious and concrete theoretical proposal in the new field of molecular electronics (UE). Based on the mesomeric effect of certain chemical compounds on organic molecules, a molecular rectifier was built by simulating the pn junction with the help of chemical compounds.

Their proposed rectifying molecule was designed so that electrical conduction within it would be favored from the electron-rich subunit or moiety (electron donor) to an electron-poor moiety (electron acceptor), but disfavored (by several electron volts) in the reverse direction.

== Research ==
Many potential rectifying molecules were studied by the groups of Robert Melville Metzger, Charles A. Panetta, and Daniell L. Mattern (University of Mississippi) between 1981 and 1991, but were not tested successfully for conductivity.

This proposal was verified in two papers in 1990 and 1993 by the groups of John Roy Sambles (University of Exeter, UK) and Geoffrey Joseph Ashwell (Cranfield University now at the Lancaster University, UK), using a monolayer of hexadecylquinolinium tricyanoquinodimethanide sandwiched between dissimilar metal electrodes (magnesium and platinum) and then confirmed in three papers in 1997 and 2001 by Metzger (now at the University of Alabama) and coworkers, who used identical metals (first aluminium, then gold).

These papers use Langmuir-Blodgett monolayers (one molecule thick) with an estimated 10^{14} to 10^{15} molecules measured in parallel. About nine similar rectifiers of vastly different structure have been found by Metzger's group between 1997 and 2006. Some more perylene based organic rectifiers with PEG (polyethylene glycol) swallowtails have been synthesized in Mattern's lab by Ramakrishna Samudrala. These rectifiers would allow the rectification to be measured with flexibility.

Single molecules bonded covalently to gold have been studied by scanning tunneling spectroscopy and some of them are unimolecular rectifiers, studied as single molecules, as shown by the groups of Luping Yu (University of Chicago) and Ashwell (later at Lancaster University, UK).

== Aims ==
The driving idea in UE (also called molecular-scale electronics) is that properly designed "electroactive" molecules, of between 1 and 3 nm in length, can supplant silicon-based devices to reduce circuit component sizes, providing concomitant increase in maximum integrated circuit speeds. However, amplification had not been realized as of 2012, and the chemical interactions between metal electrodes and molecules are complex.
