= Peter Guy Wolynes =

American theoretical chemist and physicist

Peter Wolynes
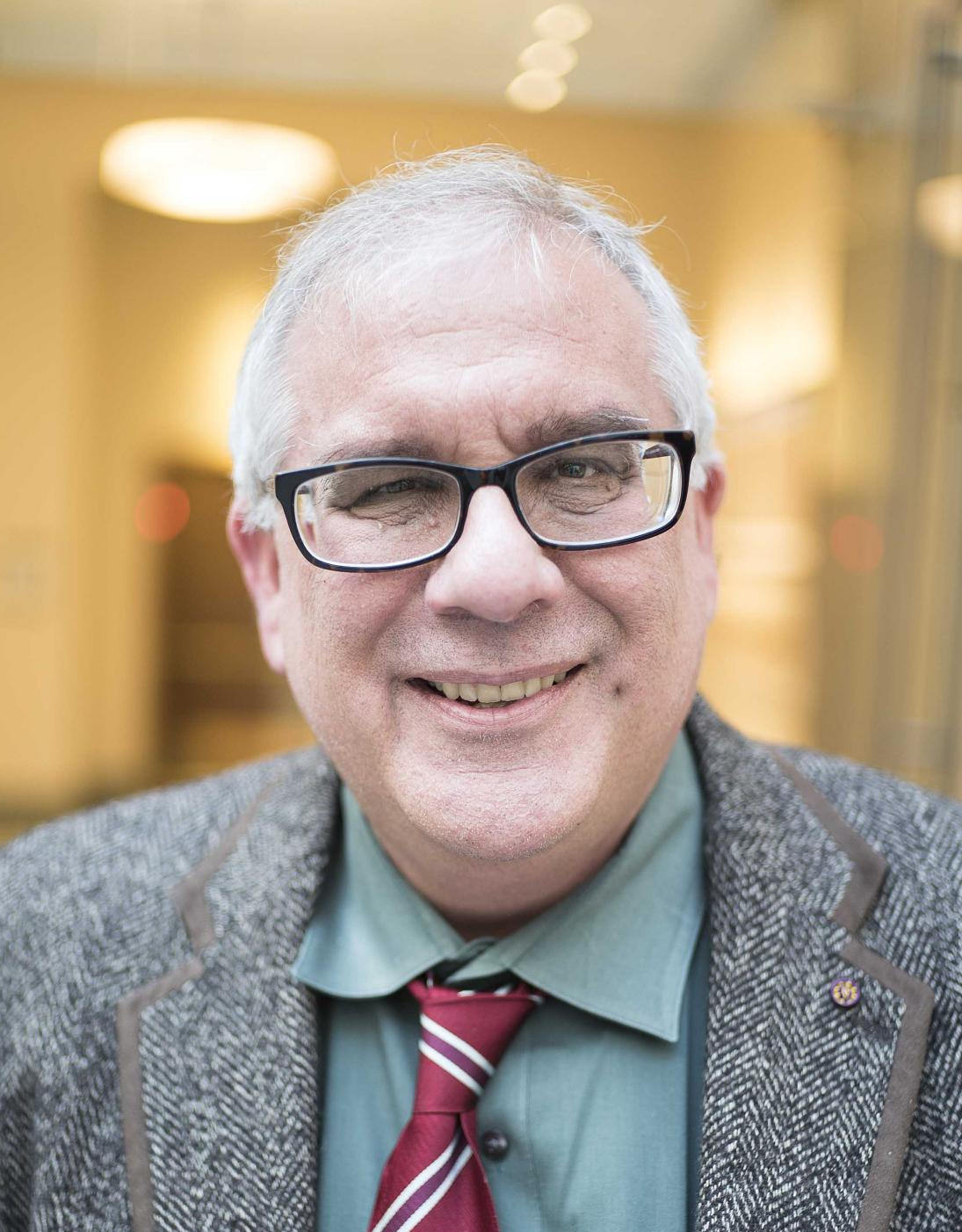
- Wolynes in 2016
- Born: Peter Guy Wolynes; April 21, 1953 (age 73); Chicago, Illinois, United States
- Education: Indiana University Bloomington; Harvard University
- Known for: Protein folding, Spin glass, Systems Biology
- Awards: ACS Award in Theoretical Chemistry, Member of National Academy of Sciences, Fellow of American Physical Society, Fellow of Biophysical Society, Foreign Member of Royal Society
- Scientific career
- Fields: Chemical Physics, Theoretical Chemistry, Systems Biology
- Workplaces: Rice University; University of California, San Diego
- Website: wolynes.rice.edu

Peter Guy Wolynes is an American theoretical chemist and physicist. Since 2011 he has been a Bullard-Welch Foundation Professor of Science and professor of chemistry at Rice University. He is widely recognized for his significant contributions to the theories of protein folding, glasses, and gene networks. Previously he was James R. Eiszner Professor at the University of Illinois at Urbana–Champaign, and the Francis H.C. Crick Chair of Physical Sciences at the University of California, San Diego.

== Education and early life ==
Wolynes was born in Chicago, Illinois, on April 21, 1953. He graduated from Indiana University Bloomington in 1971 with a B.A. in Chemistry, and from Harvard University with a Ph.D. in Chemical Physics in 1976.

== Career and research ==
After a brief postdoctoral research stint at Massachusetts Institute of Technology with John Deutch, in the fall of 1976 he became an assistant professor at the chemistry department of Harvard University at the age of 23. In 1980 he moved to the University of Illinois, eventually becoming the Center for Advanced Study Professor of Chemistry, Physics and Biophysics. In 2000 he moved to the department of chemistry and biochemistry at the University of California, San Diego, as the Francis Crick Chair in the Physical Sciences. In addition to continuing his work on many body chemical physics, protein folding and structure prediction, he studied stochastic aspects of cell biology. In 2011 he moved to Rice University as the Bullard-Welch Foundation Professor of Science, and Professor of Chemistry and Physics.

As for 2024, Peter Wolynes has published more than 460 research articles and has an h-index of 121 according to his Google Scholar profile.

Energy landscape of protein folding:

Wolynes is known worldwide in the field of biophysics for his Energy Landscapes Theory and the Principle of Minimal Frustration. This theory, that was published in 1987 together with Joseph Bryngelson, states that naturally evolved proteins have optimised their folding energy landscapes and that nature has chosen amino acid sequences so that the folded state of the protein is sufficiently stable. In addition, the acquisition of the folded state had to become a sufficiently fast process. Even though nature has reduced the level of frustration in proteins, some degree of it remains up to now as can be observed in the presence of local minima in the energy landscape of proteins.

== Awards ==
He is a member of the National Academy of Sciences and the German Academy of Sciences Leopoldina. He is a Fellow of the American Physical Society, the Biophysical Society, the American Philosophical Society, the American Academy of Arts and Sciences, and Foreign Member of the Royal Society. In 2012, he received the ACS Award in Theoretical Chemistry.
