= Sumner Slichter =

American economist

Sumner Huber Slichter
- Born: January 8, 1892; Madison, Wisconsin
- Died: September 27, 1959 (aged 67); Cambridge, Massachusetts
- Resting place: Mount Auburn Cemetery
- Education: University of Wisconsin–Madison; University of Chicago
- Scientific career
- Fields: Labor economics
- Workplaces: Harvard University
- Doctoral advisor: Harry A. Millis

Sumner Huber Slichter (January 8, 1892 – September 27, 1959) was an American economist and the first Lamont University Professor at Harvard University. An expert on unions and economic forecasting, he was well known to the public through his popular writing, and was considered by many to be the pre-eminent labor economist of the 1940s and 1950s. He was an advocate of collective bargaining, but at times supported legislation limiting unions. He was also a critic of the New Deal.

== Background ==
Sumner Huber Slichter was born on January 8, 1892, in Madison, Wisconsin, the son of Charles Sumner Slichter, a mathematician and dean of the graduate school at the University of Wisconsin. In 1913, he graduated from the University of Wisconsin and went on to earn a doctorate at the University of Chicago.

== Career ==
In 1919, Slichter taught at Princeton University. In 1920, he began teaching at Cornell University. In 1930, he moved to Harvard. After Harvard president James Bryant Conant created university professorships, not tied to any particular department, in 1936, Slichter was named the inaugural Lamont University Professor. He remained at Harvard through the end of his career. Slichter received an honorary degree from Harvard in 1942.

A regular lecturer and contributor to magazines such as Harper's, Slichter was arguably the best-known economist in America at the peak of his career. Slichter's textbook, Modern Economic Society, was a standard introductory economics textbook in America before 1950.

Slichter was president of the American Economic Association in 1941. He was elected to the American Philosophical Society in 1946.

Though critical of substantial portions of President Franklin D. Roosevelt's economic policy, Slichter served as an informal economic adviser to Harry Truman.

== Views ==
Slichter was skeptical of the New Deal as a means to provide full employment, arguing that a government guarantee of full employment created perverse incentives for employees.

As World War II drew to a close, most economists predicted that with an end to government spending on the war, the economy would collapse again. Slichter correctly predicted that with soldiers coming home seeking a normal life and material pleasures, the economy would grow strongly after the end of the war and that inflation would be a greater cause for concern than depression.

Slichter was the first major economist to recognize that the pool of labor from comparably skilled workers was not unified across the economy but rather segmented by industry, with supply and demand curves varying as a function of the industry's profitability.

== Personal life ==
Slichter was the brother of geophysicist Louis B. Slichter, father of physicist Charles Pence Slichter, and the grandfather of musician Jacob Slichter.

Slichter died in 1959 in Cambridge, Massachusetts.

== Works ==
Books: His books include:

- Turnover of factory labor (New York: D. Appleton and Company, 1919)
- Modern economic society, a survey of the existing economic order with particular reference to the United States (Ann Arbor, MI: Edwards brothers, 1926)
- Modern economic society (New York: IBAA, 1941)
- The outlook for private enterprise in America (New York: H. Holt, 1931)
- Union Policies and Industrial Management (Washington, DC : Brookings Institution, 1941)
  - Union Policies and Industrial Management (New York: Greenwood Press, 1968)
  - Union Policies and Industrial Management (New York: Arno, 1969)
- Present savings and postwar markets (New York: McGraw-Hill, 1943)
- American economic and business foundation: Summary view of American economic policies with Robert D. Calkins, J. Franklin Ebersole (New Wilmington, PA: Economic and Business Foundation, 1943)
- New pattern of labor relations with Sam A. Lewisohn, Robert J. Watt (New York: American Management Association, 1944)
- Challenge of Industrial Relations (1946)
- Basic Criteria Used in Wage Determination (1947)
- Trade Unions in a Free Society (Cambridge, MA: Harvard University Press, 1947, 1948)
- American Economy: Its Problems and Prospects (1948)
  - American Economy: Its Problems and Prospects (Westport, CN: Greenwood Press, 1979)
- What's Ahead for American Business (Boston: Little, Brown, 1951)
- Productivity: Still Going Up (New York: New York Public Library, 1952)
- Impact of Collective Bargaining on Management with James J. Healy, E. Robert Livernash (Washington, DC: Brookings Institution, 1960)
- Potentials of the American economy; selected essays edited by John T. Dunlop (Cambridge, MA: Harvard University Press, 1961)
- Economic Growth in the United States: Its History, Problems, and Prospects edited by John T. Dunlop (Baton Rouge, LA: Louisiana State University Press, 1961)
  - Economic Growth in the United States: Its History, Problems, and Prospects edited by John T. Dunlop (Westport, CN: Greenwood Press, 1981)
- Union Policies and Industrial Management (1968)

Articles: Slichter's scholarly articles include:

- "The Worker in Modern Economic Society" (review), Journal of Political Economy (1926)
- "The Current Labor Policies of American Industries," Quarterly Journal of Economics (1929)
- "Should the Budget be Balanced?" The New Republic (1932)
- "New Wisdom for a New Age: Review of Keynes's Essays in Persuasion," The New Republic (1932)
- "The Changing Character of American Industrial Relations," American Economic Review (1939)
- "What do the Strikes Teach Us?" The Atlantic Monthly (1946)
- "Wage-Price Flexibility and Employment" American Economic Review (1946)
