= Mark Ratner =

American physical chemist (1942–2026)

Mark A. Ratner
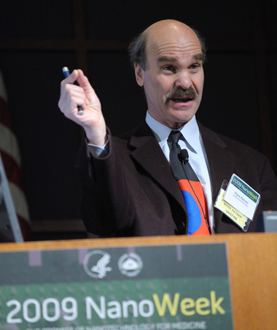
- Ratner in 2009.
- Born: December 8, 1942; Cleveland, Ohio, U.S.
- Died: May 10, 2026 (aged 83)
- Known for: Unimolecular rectifier
- Awards: Irving Langmuir Award (2004); Willard Gibbs Award (2012); Peter Debye Award (2016)
- Scientific career
- Fields: Molecular electronics
- Workplaces: Northwestern University
- Thesis: Strong-coupling model for the analysis of spectral properties of hydrogen-bonded systems (1969)
- Doctoral advisor: G. Ludwig Hofacker; Jan Linderberg

Mark Alan Ratner (December 8, 1942 – May 10, 2026) was an American chemist and professor emeritus at Northwestern University whose work focused on the interplay between molecular structure and molecular properties. He is widely credited as the "father of molecular-scale electronics" thanks to his groundbreaking work with Arieh Aviram in 1974 that first envisioned how electronic circuit elements might be constructed from single molecules and how these circuits might behave.

== Education ==
Ratner grew up in Cleveland, Ohio and graduated from Harvard University with an undergraduate degree in chemistry and obtained his Ph.D. in theoretical chemistry in 1969 from Northwestern University. He went on to postdoctoral positions in Aarhus, Denmark and Munich, Germany.

== Academic career ==
Ratner taught chemistry at New York University from 1971 until 1974. In 1974, he and Arieh Aviram proposed the first unimolecular rectifier, thus becoming pioneers in molecular electronics. In 1975, he took a position at Northwestern University, where he remained for the duration of his academic career. During more than 45 years in the chemistry department at Northwestern University, Ratner was the inaugural Lawrence B. Dumas Distinguished University Professor, the Charles E. and Emma H. Morrison Professor in Chemistry, associate and interim dean of the Weinberg College of Arts and Sciences, Co-director of ISEN (Institute for Sustainability and Energy at Northwestern), recipient of the Northwestern Alumni Merit Award, and an eleven-time member of the Faculty Teaching Honor Roll.

Ratner's major areas of research included nonlinear optical response properties of molecules; electron transfer and molecular electronics; quantum dynamics and relaxation in condensed phase; mean-field models for extended systems, including proteins and molecular assemblies; photonics in nanoscale systems; excitons in molecule-based photovoltaics and hybrid classical/quantum representations. He has published more than 1,000 papers in these fields through international collaborations, particularly in Denmark, Israel and the Netherlands.

He was a member of the International Academy of Quantum Molecular Science, the American Academy of Arts and Sciences, the Royal Danish Academy of Sciences and Letters, and the National Academy of Sciences. His honors and awards include the Feynman Prize in Nanotechnology, the Irving Langmuir Award in Chemical Physics, the Willard J. Gibbs Award, the Peter Debye Award in Physical Chemistry, and honorary ScD degrees from Hebrew University of Jerusalem and the University of Copenhagen. He also served on the Governing Board for the Bulletin of the Atomic Scientists.

== Death ==
Ratner died on May 10, 2026, at the age of 83.

== Selected works ==
- Molecular Electronics II (Annals of the New York Academy of Sciences) (July 1998) ISBN 1-57331-156-1
- Same (ed. with Ari Aviram, Vladimiro Mujica) (May 2002) ISBN 1-57331-410-2
- Electron transport in molecular wire junctions, Nitzan, A.; Ratner, M. A., Science 2003, 300, (5624), 1384–1389.
- Microscopic study of electrical transport through individual molecules with metallic contacts. I. Band lineup, voltage drop, and high-field transport, Xue, Y. Q.; Ratner, M. A., Physical Review B 2003, 68, (11).
- Molecular electronics: Some views on transport and beyond, Joachim, C.; Ratner, M. A, Proceedings of the National Academy of Sciences of the United States of America 2005, 102, (25), 8800–8800.
- Intermolecular charge transfer between heterocyclic oligomers. Effects of heteroatom and molecular packing on hopping transport in organic semiconductors, Hutchison, G. R.; Ratner, M. A.; Marks, T. J., Journal of the American Chemical Society 2005, 127, (48), 16866–16881.
- Single-molecule pulling and the folding of donor-acceptor oligorotaxanes: Phenomenology and interpretation, Franco, I.; Schatz, G. C.; Ratner, Journal of Chemical Physics 2009, 131, (12).
- Geometry and Electronic Coupling in Perylenediimide Stacks: Mapping Structure-Charge Transport Relationships, Vura-Weis, J.; Ratner, M. A.; Wasielewski, M. R., Journal of the American Chemical Society 2010, 132, (6), 1738–+.
- Exploring local currents in molecular junctions, Solomon, G. C.; Herrmann, C.; Hansen, T.; Mujica, V.; Ratner, M. A., Nature Chemistry 2010, 2, (3), 223–228.
- Molecular spintronics: Destructive quantum interference controlled by a gate, Saraiva-Souza, A.; Smeu, M.; Zhang, L.; Souza Filho, A. G.; Guo, H.; Ratner, M. A., Journal of the American Chemical Society 2014, 136, (42), 15065–15071.
- Quantum Mechanics in Chemistry (with George C. Schatz) (2002-01-28) ISBN 0-486-42003-5
- Introduction to Quantum Mechanics in Chemistry (with George C. Schatz) (2000-05-18) ISBN 0-13-895491-7
- Nanotechnology: A Gentle Introduction to the Next Big Idea (with Daniel Ratner) (2002-11-18) ISBN 0-13-101400-5
- Nanotechnology and Homeland Security: New Weapons for New Wars (with Daniel Ratner) (2003-10-24) ISBN 0-13-145307-6
