= Charles Pence Slichter =

American physicist (1924–2018)

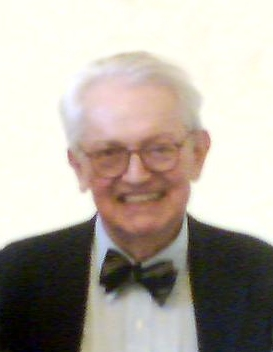
- Born: 21 January 1924; Ithaca, New York, US
- Died: 19 February 2018 (aged 94); Boulder, Colorado, US
- Education: Harvard University (BA, MA, PhD)
- Known for: J-coupling, Overhauser effect, Hebel–Slichter effect
- Awards: National Medal of Science (2007); Oliver E. Buckley Condensed Matter Prize (1996); Comstock Prize in Physics (1993); Irving Langmuir Award (1969)
- Scientific career
- Fields: Physics
- Workplaces: University of Illinois at Urbana-Champaign
- Doctoral advisor: Edward Purcell

Charles Pence Slichter (January 21, 1924 – February 19, 2018) was an American physicist, best known for his work on nuclear magnetic resonance and superconductivity.

He was awarded the 2007 National Medal of Science "for establishing nuclear magnetic resonance as a powerful tool to reveal the fundamental molecular properties of liquids and solids. His inspired teaching has led generations of physicists and chemists to develop a host of modern technologies in condensed matter physics, chemistry, biology and medicine."

== Birth and education ==
Slichter was born in 1924 in Ithaca, New York. He attended Harvard University, where in 1949 received his Ph.D. under the supervision of Edward Purcell.

== Career ==
Slichter discusses his life and career.

Slichter was a professor of physics and chemistry at the University of Illinois at Urbana-Champaign from 1949 until his retirement in 2006.

He spent one sabbatical semester (Spring 1961) as Morris Loeb Lecturer at Harvard University. The lectures he gave there formed the nucleus of his book "Principles of Magnetic Resonance".

Slichter served as a member of the National Science Board from 1976–1984; as a member and vice-chair of the President's Science Advisory Committee from 1965–1969; as a member of the President's Committee on the National Medal of Science, 1969–1974; and as a member of the President's Committee on Science and Technology Policy, 1976.

Slichter was a member (Fellow) of the Harvard Corporation, Harvard's senior governing body, from 1970–1995. He chaired the search committee that selected Neil Rudenstine as the president of Harvard in 1991. He was an elected member of the United States National Academy of Sciences, the American Academy of Arts and Sciences, and the American Philosophical Society.

== Research ==
Slichter's research focused primarily on NMR and superconductivity. His most important work includes:

- Co-discoverer of the Hebel–Slichter effect, giving the earliest evidence for the BCS theory of superconductivity.
- With Tom Carver, gave the first demonstration of the Overhauser Effect.
- With Gutowsky and McCall, discovered J-coupling.
- With Bob Schumacher and Tom Carver, performed the first measurement of the Pauli spin susceptibility of conduction electrons.

Other notable scientific contributions include the introduction of phase sensitive detection to pulsed NMR and its use to detect weak signals, studies of charge density waves and of the Kondo effect, the theory of $\ce{^{19}F}$ chemical shifts, NMR studies of high-temperature superconductivity, theory of the effects of chemical exchange on NMR spectra, and studies of NMR of metal surfaces (catalysis).

Slichter was the recipient of numerous awards, in addition to the 2007 National Medal of Science. In 1993 Slichter was awarded the Comstock Prize in Physics from the National Academy of Sciences. In 1969 he received the Langmuir Prize, and 1996 the Buckley Prize, both from the American Physical Society. The American Chemical Society honored his discovery of J-coupling with a Citation for Chemical Breakthrough Award in 2016. Slichter was an Alfred P. Sloan Fellow from 1955–1961.

Slichter received honorary Doctor of Science degrees from the University of Waterloo (1993) and Leipzig University (2010), and an honorary Doctor of Laws (LL.D.) degree from Harvard University in 1996.

== Family ==
Slichter was the son of economist Sumner Slichter, the grandson of mathematician Charles S. Slichter, the nephew of geophysicist Louis B. Slichter, the father of musician Jacob Slichter, the drummer of the rock band Semisonic, and brother of Bell Labs executive William P. Slichter.

== Books ==
- Slichter, Charles Pence (1963). Principles of magnetic resonance: with examples from solid state physics (1st ed.). Harper & Row. ISBN 9783540084761.
- Slichter, Charles Pence (1978). Principles of magnetic resonance: Second revised and expanded edition (2nd ed.). Springer. ISBN 9780387084763.
- Slichter, Charles Pence (1990). Principles of magnetic resonance: Third enlarged and updated edition (3rd ed.). Springer. ISBN 9783540501572.
