= Charles S. Slichter =

Charles Sumner Slichter
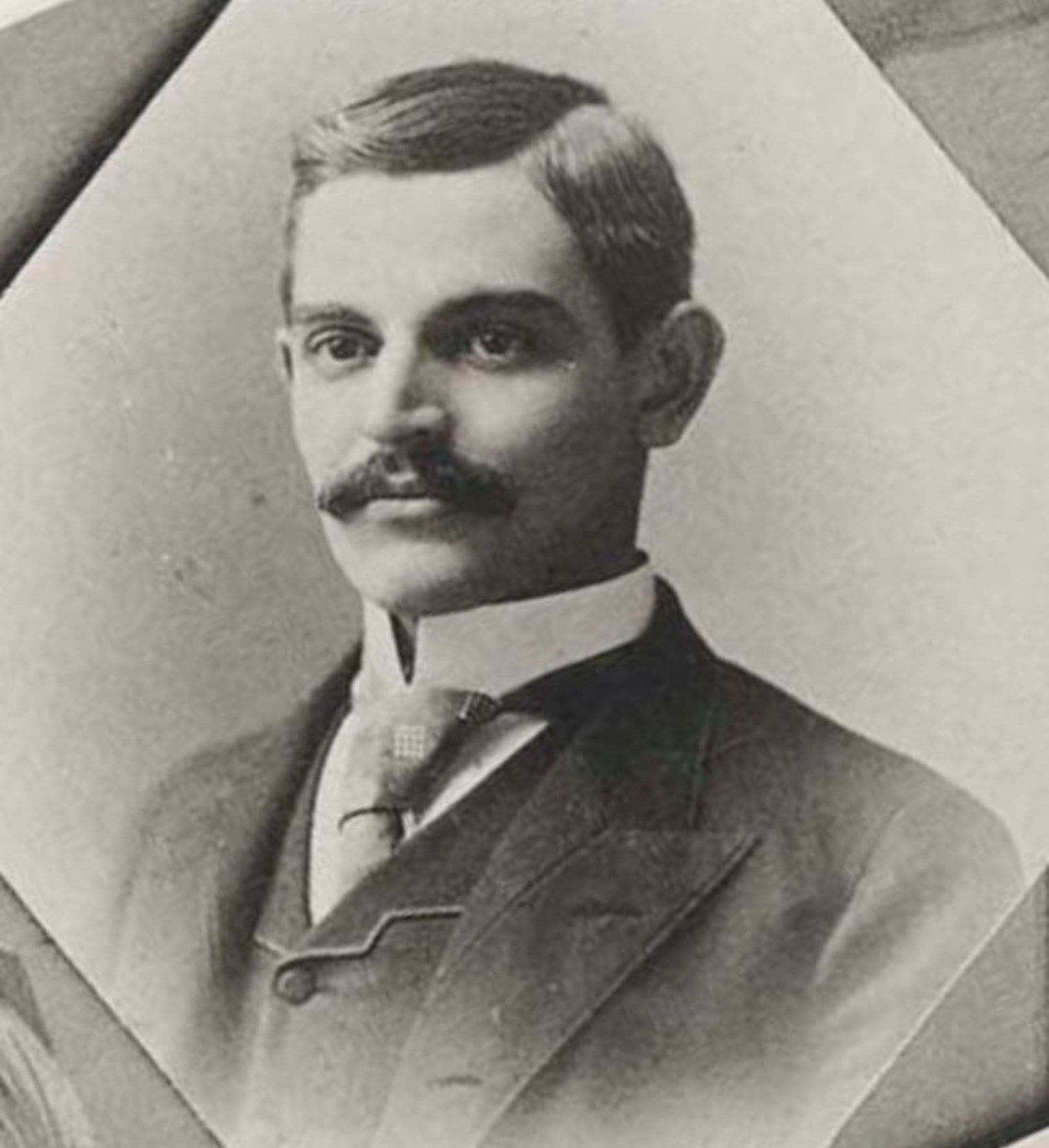
- Born: April 16, 1864; Saint Paul, Minnesota
- Died: October 4, 1946 (aged 82); Madison, Wisconsin
- Burial place: Forest Hill Cemetery
- Children: Sumner Huber Slichter, Louis Byrne Slichter, Allen Slichter, Donald Slichter
- Relatives: Charles Pence Slichter, Jacob Slichter

Academic background
- Education: Cornell University; Northwestern University

Charles Sumner Slichter (April 16, 1864 – October 4, 1946) was an applied mathematician and dean of the graduate school at the University of Wisconsin-Madison. His most notable scholarly contribution focused on hydrogeology, where he developed a method of quantifying the velocity of ground-water underflow in river valleys. This method employed ammonium chloride that would be placed in an upstream, i.e., the upgradient, well and detected in three observation wells a short distance away, i.e., the downgradient.

== Family ==
Slichter was the husband of Mary Byrne Slichter and was the father of economist Sumner Slichter, geophysicist Louis B. Slichter, industrialist Allen Slichter, and businessman Donald Slichter, the grandfather of physicist Charles Pence Slichter, and the great-grandfather of musician Jacob Slichter.

== Books ==
- Galileo, 1642-1942: an essay commemorating the tercentenary of Galileo: read before a joint meeting of the Wisconsin Chapter of Sigma Xi and the Dept. of Mathematics on November 17, 1942
- Science in a Tavern: Essays and Diversions on Science in the Making, University of Wisconsin Press, 1938
- Four-place logarithmic tables for rapid computation arranged by Charles S. Slichter, New York: Macmillan & Co. (1906)
- The tidal and other problems (1909)
- Elementary mathematical analysis, a text book for first year college students (1914)
- Observations on the ground waters of Rio Grande Valley (1905)
- Field measurements of the rate of movement of underground waters (1905)
- The motions of underground waters (1902)
- The underflow in Arkansas Valley in western Kansas (1906)
- The underflow of the South Platte valley (1906)
- Theoretical investigation of the motion of ground waters (1899)
