= Mark Reed (physicist) =

American physicist (1955–2021)

Mark Arthur Reed
- Born: January 4, 1955; Suffern, New York
- Died: May 5, 2021 (aged 66)
- Education: Syracuse University
- Known for: Quantum dots
- Scientific career
- Fields: Nanotechnology
- Workplaces: Texas Instruments; Yale University
- Doctoral advisor: Arnold Honig

Mark Arthur Reed (January 4, 1955 – May 5, 2021) was an American physicist and professor at Yale University. He is noted particularly for seminal research on quantum dots.

== Career and education ==
He coined the term quantum dots, for demonstrating the first zero-dimensional electronic device that had fully quantized energy states. Reed did research in electronic transport in nanoscale and mesoscopic systems, artificially structured materials and devices, molecular electronics, biosensors and bioelectronic systems, and nanofluidics. He was the author of more than 200 publications, had given over 75 plenary and over 400 invited talks, and held 33 U.S. and foreign patents on quantum effect, heterojunction, and molecular devices. He was the editor in chief of the journal Nanotechnology (2009–2019) and of the journal Nano Futures, and held numerous other editorial and advisory board positions. Reed received his Ph.D. from Syracuse University in 1983. He worked at Texas Instruments from 1983 to 1990, where he demonstrated the first quantum dot device. He had been at Yale School of Engineering and Applied Science since 1990, where he held the Harold Hodgkinson Chair of Engineering and Applied Science. Notable work there included the first conductance measurement of a single molecule, the first single molecule transistor, and the development of CMOS nanowire biosensors.

== Awards and recognition ==
Reed had been elected to the Connecticut Academy of Science and Engineering and Who's Who in the World. His awards included; Fortune Magazine “Most Promising Young Scientist” (1990), the Kilby Young Innovator Award (1994), the Fujitsu ISCS Quantum Device Award (2001), the Yale Science and Engineering Association Award for Advancement of Basic and Applied Science (2002), Fellow of the American Physical Society (2002), the inaugural IEEE Pioneer Award in Nanotechnology (2007), Fellow of the Institute of Electrical and Electronics Engineers (2009), and a Finalist for the World Technology Award (2010).

== Personal life ==
He married Elizabeth Schaefer on August 24, 1996. He died on May 5, 2021.

== Awards ==
- Fortune Magazine's "Most Promising Young Scientist" (1990)
- Kilby Young Innovator Award (1994)
- DARPA ULTRA Most Significant Achievement Award (1997)
- Syracuse University Distinguished Alumni award (2000)
- Fujitsu ISCS Quantum Device Award (2001)
- American Physical Society Fellowship (2002)
- Yale Science and Engineering Association Award for Advancement of Basic and Applied Science (2002)
- IEEE Fellowship (2009)
