= Willis H. Flygare =

American chemist and academic (1936–1981

Willis H. Flygare (July 24, 1936 – May 18, 1981) was an American physical chemist and professor at University of Illinois at Urbana–Champaign.

== Background ==
Flygare was born in Jackson, Minnesota. He was the son of Willis B. and Doris H. Flygare, both of whom were of Scandinavian descent. He attended St. Olaf College in Northfield, Minnesota, from which he graduated in 1958 with majors in chemistry, physics, and mathematics. He later attended graduate school at the University of California, Berkeley, earning his Ph.D. in chemistry in 1961.

== Career ==
Flygare became a professor of chemistry at the University of Illinois in 1961 and stayed in that position until his premature death at age 44 of Lou Gehrig disease. Flygare is credited with "outstanding contributions to the understanding of molecular electronic structure".

He invented a highly sensitive pulsed-beam, Fourier-transform microwave spectrometer.

He also developed a new method based on the molecular Zeeman effect for measurements of molecular quadrupole moments and magnetic susceptibility anisotropies.

He received Irving Langmuir Award in 1981.

Flygare was a member of the National Academy of Sciences.

The University of Illinois established lectures in his name and a memorial fund.

== Awards and distinctions ==
- Guggenheim Fellowships in 1972 and 1978
- Phi Lambda Upsilon Fresenius Award in 1971
- Baekeland Medal in 1973
- Irving Langmuir Award in 1981
- elected to the National Academy of Sciences in 1974
- honorary doctorate from St. Olaf College in 1976
