= Morgan Sheng =

Taiwanese neurobiologist

PhD Morgan Sheng
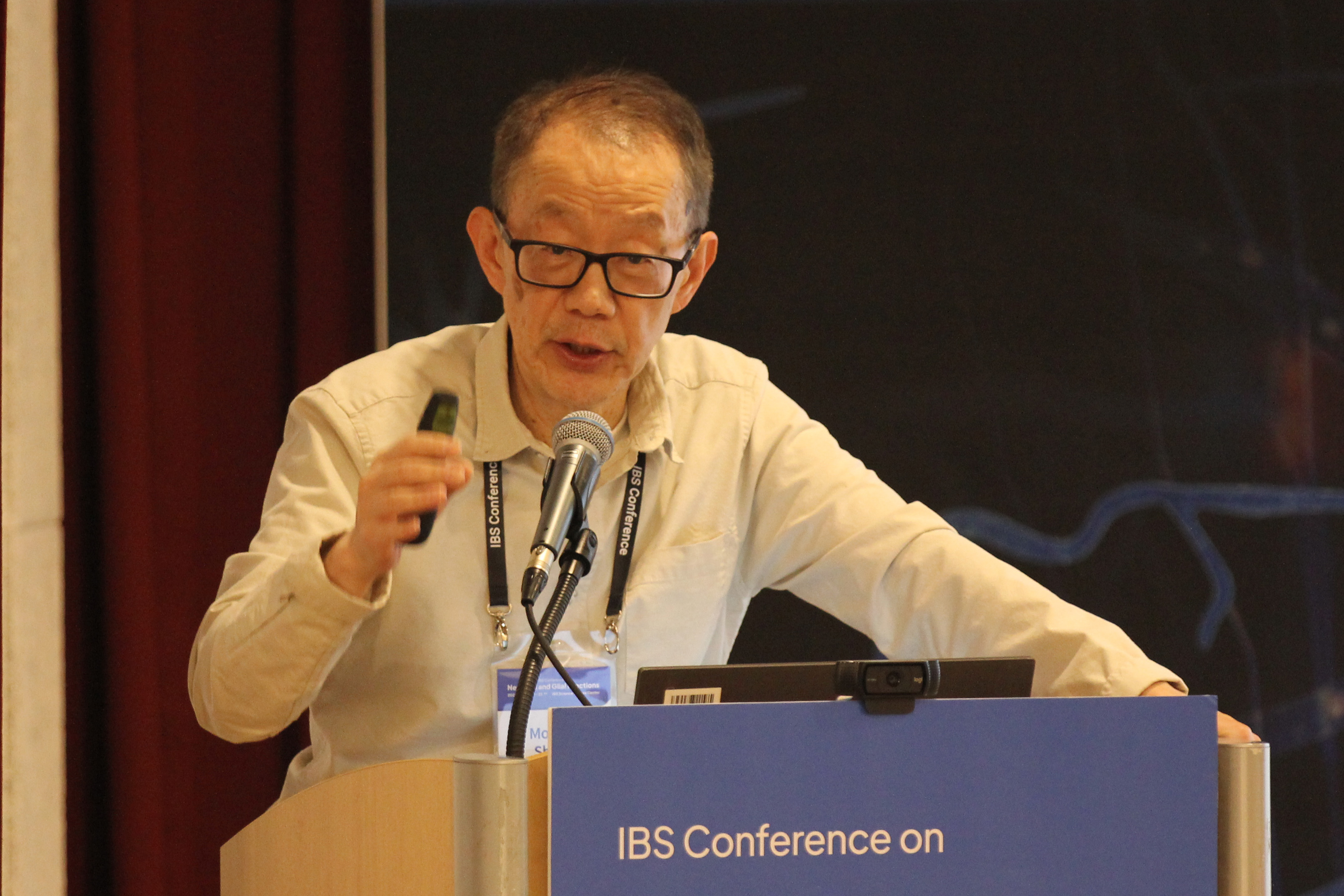
- Born: February 23, 1958; Taipei, Taiwan
- Education: PhD in molecular genetics
- Alma mater: Harvard University
- Scientific career
- Fields: Synaptic plasticity, neurodegeneration, therapeutics, psychiatric disorders
- Workplaces: Stanley Center for Psychiatric Research at Broad Institute, McGovern Institute for Brain Research, Massachusetts General Hospital, Harvard Medical School, Genentech, Howard Hughes Medical Institute
- Doctoral advisor: Michael E. Greenberg
- Notable students: Casper Hoogenraad
- Website: Sheng Lab

Morgan Hwa-Tze Sheng is a professor of neurobiology and a Core Institute Member at the Broad Institute, where he is a co-director of the Stanley Center for Psychiatric Research at Broad Institute. He is a professor of neuroscience in the Department of Brain and Cognitive Sciences as well as the Menicon Professor of Neuroscience at Massachusetts Institute of Technology. He is also an associate member at both The Picower Institute for Learning and McGovern Institute for Brain Research. He has served on the editorial boards of Current Opinions in Neurobiology, Neuron, and The Journal of Neuroscience.

== Education ==
Sheng received a PhD in molecular genetics from Harvard University.

== Career ==
His postdoc was performed at the University of California, San Francisco. Following that, Sheng was an assistant professor and associate professor at the Massachusetts General Hospital and Harvard Medical School, an investigator at the Howard Hughes Medical Institute, professor of neuroscience at Massachusetts Institute of Technology, and vice president of neuroscience at Genentech. His research has focused on pathogenic mechanisms of neurodegenerative diseases and molecular cellular biology of synapses and synaptic plasticity.

== Honors and awards ==
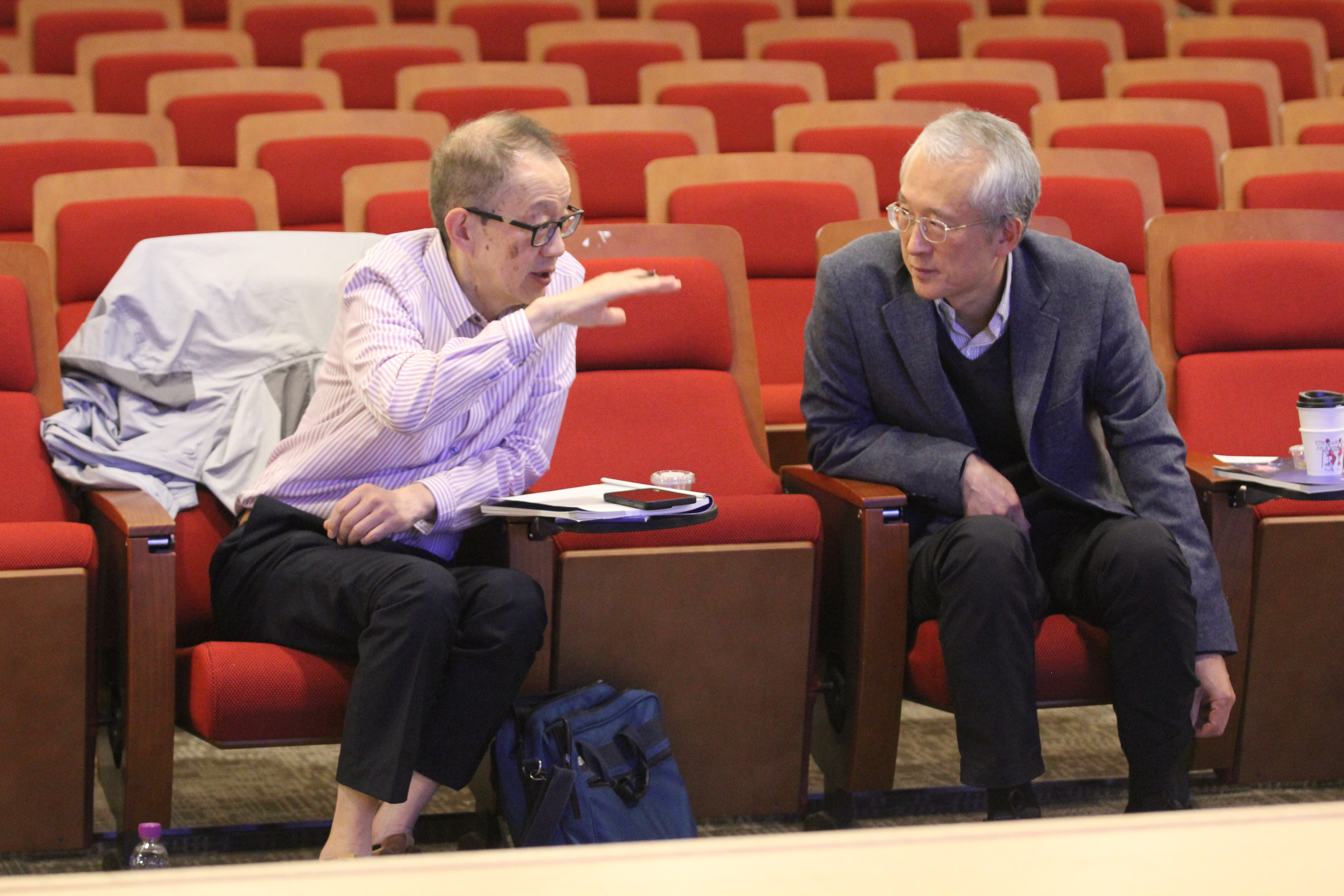
Morgan Sheng (left) and Eunjoon Kim (right) speaking together at the IBS Conference on Neuronal and Glial Functions.

- 2023: Member, National Academy of Medicine
- 2020: Julius Axelrod Prize, Society for Neuroscience
- 2010: Honorary fellow, University of Oxford Corpus Christi College
- 2009: Fellow, Academy of Medical Sciences
- 2007: Fellow, Royal Society
- 2006: Neuronal Plasticity Prize, Fondation IPSEN
- 2005: Outstanding Achievement Award, Neuroscience Division, Society of Chinese Bioscientists in America
- 2004: Fellow, American Association for the Advancement of Science
- 1999: Young Investigator Award, Society for Neuroscience
- 1995: Member, Society for Neuroscience

== Selected publications ==
- Sheng, Morgan; Greenberg, Michael E. (1 April 1990). "The regulation and function of c-fos and other immediate early genes in the nervous system". Neuron. 4 (4). Cell Press: 477–485. doi:10.1016/0896-6273(90)90106-P. PMID 1969743.
- Kim, Eunjoon; Sheng, Morgan (1 October 2004). "PDZ domain proteins of synapses". Nature Reviews Neuroscience. 5 (10): 771–781. doi:10.1038/nrn1517. PMID 15378037.
- Sheng, Morgan; Thompson, Margaret A.; Greenberg, Michael E. (7 June 1991). "CREB: a Ca2+-Regulated Transcription Factor Phosphorylated by Calmodulin-Dependent Kinases". Science. 252 (5011): 1427–1430. doi:10.1126/science.1646483. PMID 1646483.
- Morgan, Sheng; Cummings, Jennifer; Roldan, Leslie Ann; Jan, Yuh Nung; Jan, Lily Yeh (10 March 1994). "Changing subunit composition of heteromeric NMDA receptors during development of rat cortex". Nature. 368 (6467). Nature Publishing Group UK: 144–147. doi:10.1038/368144a0. PMID 8139656.
- Li, Zheng; Okamoto, Ken-Ichi; Hayashi, Yasunori; Sheng, Morgan (17 December 2004). "The importance of dendritic mitochondria in the morphogenesis and plasticity of spines and synapses". Cell. 119 (6). Elsevier: 873–887. doi:10.1016/j.cell.2004.11.003. PMID 15607982.

== See also ==
- Paul Blainey
- Feng Zhang
- Eunjoon Kim
- Steven Hyman
