= Liqun Luo =

Chinese-American neuroscientist (born 1966)

- 骆利群
- Born: January 1966 (age 60)
- Education: University of Science and Technology of China; Brandeis University
- Scientific career
- Fields: Neuroscience
- Workplaces: Stanford University
- Doctoral advisor: Kalpana White
- Other academic advisors: Yuh-Nung Jan and Lily Jan
- Website: https://web.stanford.edu/group/luolab/

Liqun Luo (Chinese: 骆利群; born January 1966) is a neuroscientist in the Department of Biology at Stanford University, where he is the Ann and Bill Swindells Professor in the School of Humanities and Sciences, and an investigator of the Howard Hughes Medical Institute. His laboratory studies the development and organization of neural circuits, and he is the author of the textbook Principles of Neurobiology.

== Early life and education ==
Luo was born in January 1966 in Shanghai, China. After graduating from the middle school of No.1 High School Affiliated to East China Normal University, he was admitted to the Special Class for the Gifted Young at the University of Science and Technology of China (USTC) in 1981 and skipped high school.

Luo earned his bachelor's degree in molecular biology from the University of Science and Technology of China in 1986. He completed his PhD at Brandeis University in 1992, studying the Drosophila melanogaster homolog of the Amyloid precursor protein. After his postdoctoral work in the lab of Lily Jan and Yuh Nung Jan at the University of California in San Francisco, he became an assistant professor in the Department of Biology at Stanford University in 1996.

== Research ==
Luo's research focuses on the assembly and organization of neural circuits. His lab has invented tools to facilitate mosaic analysis in flies (MARCM) and mice (MADM).

== Honors and awards ==
Luo has been an Investigator of the Howard Hughes Medical Institute since 2005, and is a member of the National Academy of Sciences and the American Academy of Arts and Sciences. He has received numerous awards including the Technology Innovation in Neuroscience award from the McKnight Foundation and The Young Investigator Award from the Society for Neuroscience.
