= Patrícia Monteiro =

Portuguese neuroscientist

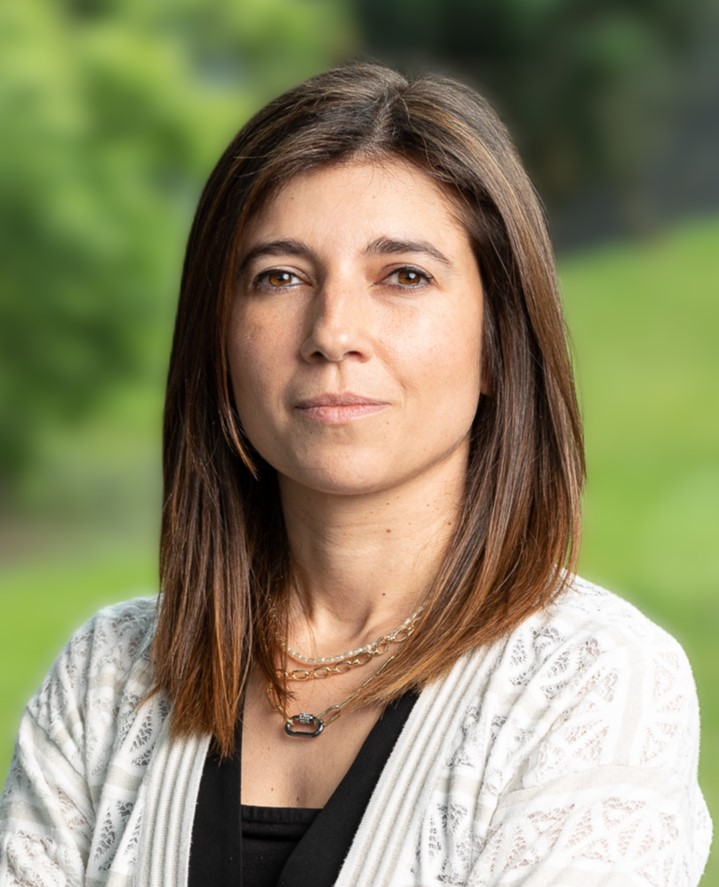
- Born: 1983 (age 42–43)
- Education: University of Coimbra; Massachusetts Institute of Technology
- Known for: Research on neurodevelopmental disorders
- Awards: FEBS Excellence Award (2021), Branco Weiss Fellowship (2016-2021), EMBO Advisory Board Member
- Scientific career
- Fields: Neuroscience, Neurophysiology, Biomedicine, Optogenetics
- Workplaces: Massachusetts Institute of Technology (MIT); University of Minho; University of Porto (FMUP)
- Doctoral advisor: Guoping Feng

Patrícia Monteiro is a Portuguese neuroscientist and Research Group Leader at the Faculty of Medicine of the University of Porto (FMUP). She is known for her research on the neural mechanisms underlying neuropsychiatric and neurodevelopmental disorders.

== Education ==
Monteiro holds BSc and MSc degrees in Pharmaceutical Sciences and a PhD in Neuroscience. She received her doctoral training at the Massachusetts Institute of Technology from Prof. Guoping Feng and was an EMBO postdoctoral fellow at the Life and Health Sciences Research Institute (ICVS), University of Minho.

== Research ==
Monteiro's PhD research focused on understanding the brain circuitry mechanisms underlying repetitive behaviors in obsessive-compulsive disorder and autism-spectrum disorder. Her main contributions during this period included a study demonstrating the reversal of autistic-like behaviors in adult mice by restoring the SHANK3 gene, and coauthoring a publication showing that specific human mutations in the SHANK3 gene can lead to distinct neuropsychiatric disorders.

Following her PhD, Monteiro worked with Prof. Nuno Sousa at ICVS, University of Minho, under an EMBO postdoctoral fellowship, where she studied the impact of chronic stress on neural circuits.

Monteiro's lab at FMUP employs electrophysiological brain recordings and novel neuroengineering tools to study neuropsychiatric and neurodevelopmental disorders. Her research focuses on how cortico-basal ganglia-thalamo circuits encode and decode information in the brain, and how disruptions in these circuits can result in disorders such as ASD and OCD. Her lab is also involved in the development of new technologies with translational potential to monitor and modulate brain activity, including neural probes, nanobioelectronic neural interfaces, and non-invasive/wireless brain stimulators.

== Awards ==
Monteiro has received a number of awards and distinctions, including the FEBS Excellence Award from the Federation of European Biochemical Societies and the Branco Weiss Fellowship. She is an invited junior member of the Portuguese National Academy of Sciences and serves as an Advisory Board Member for the European Molecular Biology Organization (EMBO) Scientific Exchange Grants (SEG) program.

== Selected publications ==
- Rodrigues D, Jacinto L, Falcão M, Castro AC, Cruz A, Santa C, Manadas B, Marques F, Sousa N, Monteiro P (2022). Chronic stress causes striatal disinhibition mediated by SOM-interneurons in male mice. Nature Communications 13(1): 7355.
- Monteiro P, & Feng G (2017). SHANK proteins: roles at the synapse and in autism spectrum disorder. Nature Neuroscience 18: 147-157.
- Mei Y#, Monteiro P#, Zhou Y, Kim J, Gao X, Fu Z, & Feng G (2016). Adult restoration of Shank3 expression rescues selective autistic-like phenotypes. Nature 530: 481-484.
- Zhou Y, Kaiser T, Monteiro P, Zhang X, Van der Goes M.S, Wang D, Barak B, Zeng M, Li C, Lu C, Wells M, Amaya A, Nguyen S, Lewis M, Sanjana N, Zhou Y, Zhang M, Zhang F, Fu Z, Feng G (2016). Mice with Shank3 mutations associated with ASD and schizophrenia display both shared and distinct defects. Neuron 89: 147-162.
- Burguiere E, Monteiro P, Mallet L, Feng G, & Graybiel A.M (2015). Striatal circuits, habits, and implications for obsessive–compulsive disorder. Current Opinion (Elsevier) 30: 59-65.
- Burguiere E, Monteiro P, Feng G, & Graybiel A.M (2013). Optogenetic stimulation of lateral orbitofronto-striatal pathway suppresses compulsive behaviors. Science 340: 1243-1246.
- Gomes J.R, Costa J.T, Melo C.V, Felizzi F, Monteiro P, Pinto M.J, Inácio A.R, Wieloch T, Almeida R.D, Graos M, Duarte C.B (2012). Excitotoxicity downregulates TrkB. FL signaling and upregulates the neuroprotective truncated TrkB receptors in cultured hippocampal and striatal neurons. Journal of Neuroscience 32: 4610-4622.
