= Maria Lehtinen =

American neuroscientist

Maria K. Lehtinen
- Education: Harvard University (PhD)
- Awards: NYSCF Robertson Neuroscience Investigator
- Scientific career
- Fields: Neuroscience
- Workplaces: Harvard Medical School
- Website: www.childrenshospital.org/research/labs/lehtinen-laboratory

Maria K. Lehtinen is a neuroscientist and Associate Professor at Harvard Medical School. She is a New York Stem Cell Foundation Robertson Neuroscience Investigator and holds the Hannah C. Kinney, MD Chair in Pediatric Pathology Research at Boston Children's Hospital. Her research focuses on cerebrospinal fluid-based signaling in the central nervous system.

== Education and Training ==
Lehtinen did her undergraduate studies at University of Pennsylvania. She then received her PhD in Neurobiology from Harvard University working in the laboratory of Azad Bonni. Her graduate work elucidating the biological mechanisms of oxidative stress has been cited over 700 times.

Lehtinen did a postdoctoral fellowship in the laboratory of Anna-Elina Lehesjoki at the University of Helsinki in Finland where she discovered a physiological mechanism underlying progressive myoclonus epilepsy. She then continued her postdoctoral work with Christopher A. Walsh at Boston Children's Hospital, discovering that cerebrospinal fluid (CSF) affects the proliferation of neural progenitor cells during brain development.

== Career and Research ==
In 2010, Lehtinen received a prestigious K99/R00 NIH Pathway to Independence award from the National Institute of Neurological Disorders and Stroke. This award funded her transition from postdoctoral fellow to assistant professor as she launched her independent laboratory at Boston Children's Hospital studying CSF-mediated signaling during development.

Lehtinen's work has shed light on several crucial aspects of biology. Her early groundbreaking work demonstrated formerly unrecognized spatial heterogeneity in the choroid plexus. She has made several discoveries on the mechanisms of brain development, and how that development is regulated by amniotic fluid and CSF. Her work has also identified mechanistic underpinnings of developmental abnormalities including choroid plexus and ciliary body tumorigenesis and microcephaly in LIG4 syndrome

== Publications ==
- Lehtinen, Maria; Zengqiang Yuan; Boag, Peter; et al. (2006). "A conserved MST-FOXO signaling pathway mediates oxidative-stress responses and extends life span". Cell. 125 (5): 987–1001. doi:10.1016/j.cell.2006.03.046. PMID 16751106. Wikidata Q24338599.
- Lehtinen, Maria; Mauro W Zappaterra; Xi Chen; et al. (2011). "The cerebrospinal fluid provides a proliferative niche for neural progenitor cells". Neuron. 69 (5): 893–905. doi:10.1016/j.neuron.2011.01.023. PMC 3085909. PMID 21382550. Wikidata Q34169014.
- Yoshiyuki Konishi; Lehtinen, Maria; Nicole Donovan; Azad Bonni (2002). "Cdc2 phosphorylation of BAD links the cell cycle to the cell death machinery". Molecular Cell. 9 (5): 1005–1016. doi:10.1016/s1097-2765(02)00524-5. PMID 12049737. S2CID 18979336. Wikidata Q44017737.

== Awards and honors ==
Lehtinen was a recipient of the 2017 Presidential Early Career Award for Scientists and Engineers.
