= Michael E. Greenberg =

American neuroscientist (born 1954)

- Born: May 25, 1954 (age 72); Miami Beach, Florida, U.S.
- Education: Wesleyan University, Rockefeller University
- Known for: Molecular neuroscience, c-fos
- Awards: Perl-UNC Prize (2008)
- Scientific career
- Fields: Neurobiology
- Workplaces: Harvard Medical School
- Doctoral advisor: Gerald Edelman
- Website: http://greenberg.hms.harvard.edu/

Michael Eldon Greenberg (born May 25, 1954) is an American neuroscientist who specializes in molecular neurobiology. He served as the Chair of the Department of Neurobiology at Harvard Medical School from 2008 to 2022.

== Biography ==
Michael Greenberg grew up in Brooklyn, New York and graduated from Wesleyan University (magna cum laude) in 1976 with a degree in chemistry. He conducted his Ph.D. research and began his post-doctoral research at Rockefeller University in New York City in the laboratory of Nobel Laureate Gerald Edelman. He later completed his postdoctoral research with Edward Ziff at New York University Medical Center.

During his time in Ziff's lab, Greenberg observed that the transcription of c-fos, a cellular proto-oncogene, is induced within minutes of activation by neurotrophic factors, one of the first mechanistic descriptions of how cells respond to external signals. This finding in cell culture led to the observation that neuronal activity and even sensory experience can induce c-fos expression in the brain; this finding is now considered a principal tenet in neurobiology, and is widely used in neuroscience as a bona fide marker of active neurons. The Nobel Prize-winning experiments of Torsten Wiesel and David Hubel in the 1960s showed that visual experience is required during development to establish proper circuitry in the visual cortex, however the cellular and molecular basis for this was unknown. The identification of c-fos, and other activity-dependent genes, provided a molecular mechanism that explained how experience (i.e. nurture) can be coupled with a cellular process (i.e. nature).

In 1986, Greenberg moved to Boston, Massachusetts to start his lab in the Department of Microbiology and Molecular Genetics at Harvard Medical School. In 1999, he was named Director of the Neurobiology Program at Boston Children's Hospital. In 2008, he became the Department Chair of the Department of Neurobiology at Harvard Medical School.

Greenberg has mentored a number of neuroscientists including Morgan Sheng, David Ginty, Azad Bonni, Anne Brunet, Ricardo Dolmetsch, Anirvan Ghosh, Hilmar Bading, and Michael Z. Lin.

== Research ==
The Greenberg Lab works to understand the mechanisms by which the activity-dependent gene expression program regulates brain development and function. The lab has been able to characterize many of the fundamental steps in this process, from the initial activation of ion channels that depolarize neurons, the subsequent downstream signaling cascade that culminates in gene expression, and the pattern of experience-dependent gene expression in particular subtypes of cells in the brain, such as inhibitory versus excitatory neurons.

This activity-dependent gene expression has been shown to play an important biological role in nervous system development and function, specifically in the formation of inhibitory circuits in the brain. Greenberg and colleagues showed that through introduction of a mutation in a particular site in the promoter of the activity-dependent gene, Bdnf, visual experience was unable to induce Bdnf expression in the cortex of mice and the formation of inhibitory synapses and circuits was disrupted in these animals. The investigators found no effect in excitatory synapse formation or function.

The Greenberg lab also discovered NPAS4, an activity-dependent transcription factor that is required for inhibitory synapse formation through its regulation of Bdnf transcription, and other activity-dependent genes. Similar to their previous finding, they found a specific role for this genetic program in inhibitory circuit development, since perturbation of NPAS4 function had no effect in excitatory synapse formation or function. Thus, the activity-dependent gene program plays a key role specifically in the development of inhibitory circuits in the cortex, which are responsible for fine-tuning neuronal output and nervous system function.

In 2010, the Greenberg lab discovered a new class of RNAs called enhancer RNAs (eRNA), RNAs that are transcribed from enhancer regions of chromosomes. Greenberg and colleagues found that eRNAs are transcribed in response to neuronal activity, and function to control the expression of other genes in cells. The role of eRNAs in regulating gene expression in health and disease is continuing to be explored in various fields, such as cancer research.

Greenberg has also researched the molecular biology and genetics of autism spectrum disorders, specifically in Rett syndrome, a disorder that is caused by mutations in MeCP2, a methyl-DNA binding protein that regulates transcription. His studies have examined the experience-dependent gene program in mouse models of Rett syndrome, and specifically, how mutations in MeCP2 disrupt the expression of particularly long genes in the brain.

The Greenberg lab is currently studying activity-dependent gene expression in human neurons, and is comparing this program of gene expression to other mammals and other primates. In 2016, he and his colleagues identified a gene that is selectively induced in human and primate brains following stimulation. They found that the gene, called osteocrin, while expressed in mouse bone and muscle, is not detected in rodent brains, and that its inducible expression in primate neurons is conferred by the evolution of DNA regulatory elements that bind the activity-dependent transcription factor, MEF2.

== Publications ==
Greenberg is the author of more than 200 articles and serves on the editorial boards of the following journals, among others: Journal of Neuroscience; Learning & Memory; Neuron; and Molecular & Cellular Neuroscience.

== Awards & Honors ==
1990 - 1992: McKnight award for technological advances in neuroscience

2006: Edward M. Scolnick Prize in Neuroscience,

2015: Gruber Prize in Neuroscience, along with Carla Shatz.

2023: The Brain Prize.

Greenberg is a member of the American Academy of Arts and Sciences and of the National Academy of Sciences.
