= Mosaic (genetics) =

Possession of multiple genetic lineages within a multi-cellular organism

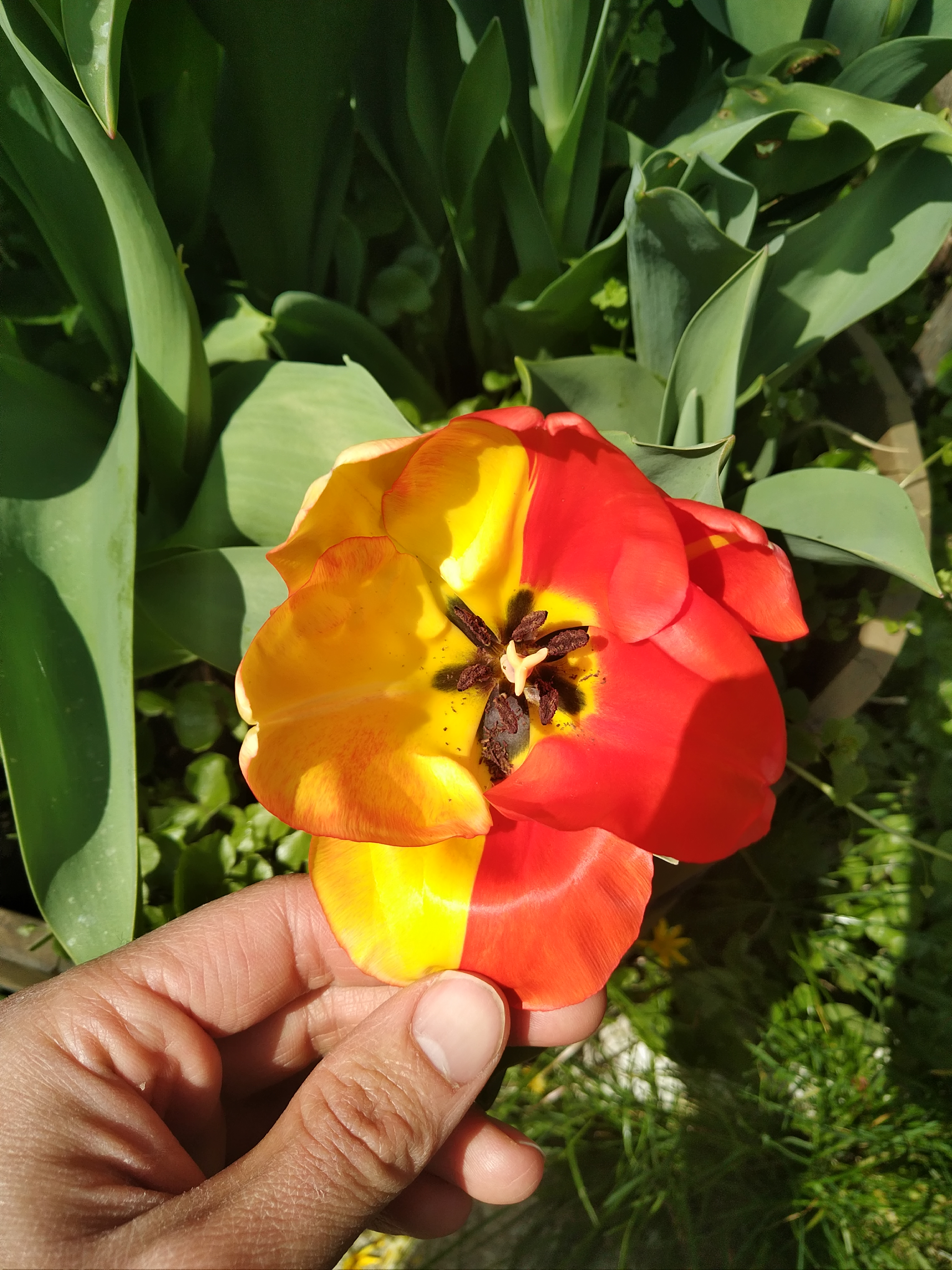
Tulip flower showing mosaicism

Mosaicism or genetic mosaicism is a condition in which a multicellular organism possesses more than one genetic line as the result of genetic mutation. This means that various genetic lines resulted from a single fertilized egg. Mosaicism is one of several possible causes of chimerism, wherein a single organism is composed of cells with more than one distinct genotype.

Genetic mosaicism can result from many different mechanisms including chromosome nondisjunction, anaphase lag, and endoreplication. Anaphase lagging is the most common way by which mosaicism arises in the preimplantation embryo. Mosaicism can also result from a mutation in one cell during development, in which case the mutation will be passed on only to its daughter cells (and will be present only in certain adult cells). Somatic mosaicism is not generally inheritable as it does not generally affect germ cells.

== History ==
In 1929, Alfred Sturtevant studied mosaicism in Drosophila, a genus of fruit fly. H. J. Muller in 1930 demonstrated that mosaicism in Drosophila is always associated with chromosomal rearrangements, and Schultz in 1936 showed that, in all cases studied, these rearrangements were associated with heterochromatic inert regions. Several hypotheses on the nature of such mosaicism were proposed. One hypothesis assumed that mosaicism appears as the result of a break and loss of chromosome segments. Curt Stern in 1935 assumed that the structural changes in the chromosomes took place as a result of somatic crossing, as a result of which mutations or small chromosomal rearrangements in somatic cells. Thus the inert region causes an increase in mutation frequency or small chromosomal rearrangements in active segments adjacent to inert regions.

In the 1930s, Stern demonstrated that genetic recombination, normal in meiosis, can also take place in mitosis. When it does, it results in somatic (body) mosaics. These organisms contain two or more genetically distinct types of tissue. The term somatic mosaicism was used by CW Cotterman in 1956 in his seminal paper on antigenic variation.

In 1944, M. L. Belgovskii proposed that mosaicism could not account for certain mosaic expressions caused by chromosomal rearrangements involving heterochromatic inert regions. The associated weakening of biochemical activity led to what he called a genetic chimera.

== Types ==
=== Germline mosaicism ===
Germline or gonadal mosaicism is a particular form of mosaicism wherein some gametes—i.e., sperm or oocytes—carry a mutation, but the rest are normal. The cause is usually a mutation that occurred in an early stem cell that gave rise to all or part of the gametes.

=== Somatic mosaicism ===
Somatic mosaicism (also known as clonal mosaicism) occurs when the somatic cells of the body are of more than one genotype. In the more common mosaics, different genotypes arise from a single fertilized egg cell, due to mitotic errors at first or later cleavages.

Somatic mutation leading to mosaicism is prevalent in the beginning and end stages of human life. Somatic mosaics are common in embryogenesis due to retrotransposition of long interspersed nuclear element-1 (LINE-1 or L1) and Alu transposable elements. In early development, DNA from undifferentiated cell types may be more susceptible to mobile element invasion due to long, unmethylated regions in the genome. Further, the accumulation of DNA copy errors and damage over a lifetime lead to greater occurrences of mosaic tissues in aging humans. As longevity has increased dramatically over the last century, human genome may not have had time to adapt to cumulative effects of mutagenesis. Thus, cancer research has shown that somatic mutations are increasingly present throughout a lifetime and are responsible for most leukemia, lymphomas, and solid tumors.

==== Trisomies, monosomies, and related conditions ====
The most common form of mosaicism found through prenatal diagnosis involves trisomies. Although most forms of trisomy are due to problems in meiosis and affect all cells of the organism, some cases occur where the trisomy occurs in only a selection of the cells. This may be caused by a nondisjunction event in an early mitosis, resulting in a loss of a chromosome from some trisomic cells. Generally, this leads to a milder phenotype than in nonmosaic patients with the same disorder.

In rare cases, intersex conditions can be caused by mosaicism where some cells in the body have XX and others XY chromosomes (46, XX/XY). In the fruit fly Drosophila melanogaster, where a fly possessing two X chromosomes is a female and a fly possessing a single X chromosome is a sterile male, a loss of an X chromosome early in embryonic development can result in sexual mosaics, or gynandromorphs. Likewise, a loss of the Y chromosome can result in XY/X mosaic males.

An example of this is one of the milder forms of Klinefelter syndrome, called 46,XY/47,XXY mosaic wherein some of the patient's cells contain XY chromosomes, and some contain XXY chromosomes. The 46/47 annotation indicates that the XY cells have the normal number of 46 total chromosomes, and the XXY cells have a total of 47 chromosomes.

Also monosomies can present with some form of mosaicism. The only non-lethal full monosomy occurring in humans is the one causing Turner's syndrome. Around 30% of Turner's syndrome cases demonstrate mosaicism, while complete monosomy (45, X) occurs in about 50–60% of cases.

Mosaicism isn't necessarily deleterious, though. Revertant somatic mosaicism is a rare recombination event with a spontaneous correction of a mutant, pathogenic allele. In revertant mosaicism, the healthy tissue formed by mitotic recombination can outcompete the original, surrounding mutant cells in tissues such as blood and epithelia that regenerate often. In the skin disorder ichthyosis with confetti, normal skin spots appear early in life and increase in number and size over time.

Other endogenous factors can also lead to mosaicism, including mobile elements, DNA polymerase slippage, and unbalanced chromosome segregation. Exogenous factors include nicotine and UV radiation. Somatic mosaics have been created in Drosophila using X‑ray treatment and the use of irradiation to induce somatic mutation has been a useful technique in the study of genetics.

True mosaicism should not be mistaken for the phenomenon of X-inactivation, where all cells in an organism have the same genotype, but a different copy of the X chromosome is expressed in different cells. The latter is the case in normal (XX) female mammals, although it is not always visible from the phenotype (as it is in calico cats). However, all multicellular organisms are likely to be somatic mosaics to some extent.

==== Gonosomal mosaicism ====
Gonosomal mosaicism is a type of somatic mosaicism that occurs very early in the organisms development and thus is present within both germline and somatic cells. Somatic mosaicism is not generally inheritable as it does not usually affect germ cells. In the instance of gonosomal mosaicism, organisms have the potential to pass the genetic alteration, including to potential offspring because the altered allele is present in both somatic and germline cells.

==== Brain cell mosaicism ====
A frequent type of neuronal genomic mosaicism is copy number variation. Possible sources of such variation were suggested to be incorrect repairs of DNA damage and somatic recombination.

==== Mitotic recombination ====
One basic mechanism that can produce mosaic tissue is mitotic recombination or somatic crossover. It was first discovered by Curt Stern in Drosophila in 1936. The amount of tissue that is mosaic depends on where in the tree of cell division the exchange takes place. A phenotypic character called "twin spot" seen in Drosophila is a result of mitotic recombination. However, it also depends on the allelic status of the genes undergoing recombination. Twin spot occurs only if the heterozygous genes are linked in repulsion, i.e. the trans phase. The recombination needs to occur between the centromeres of the adjacent gene. This gives an appearance of yellow patches on the wild-type background in Drosophila. another example of mitotic recombination is the Bloom's syndrome, which happens due to the mutation in the blm gene. The resulting BLM protein is defective. The defect in RecQ, a helicase, facilitates the defective unwinding of DNA during replication, thus is associated with the occurrence of this disease.

==== Clustered monoallelic mosaicism (cMoMa) ====
A genetic mosaicism where an individual carries two distinct variants in close proximity (i.e. within several base paris on the same gene) in distinct cell lineages that are mutually exclusive on the singel cell level. This results in a total of three genetically distinct cell lineages: wildtype, variant one, and variant two. Both variants are located on the same parental allele.

== Use in experimental biology ==
Genetic mosaics are a particularly powerful tool when used in the commonly studied fruit fly, where specially selected strains frequently lose an X or a Y chromosome in one of the first embryonic cell divisions. These mosaics can then be used to analyze such things as courtship behavior, and female sexual attraction.

More recently, the use of a transgene incorporated into the Drosophila genome has made the system far more flexible. The flip recombinase (or FLP) is a gene from the commonly studied yeast Saccharomyces cerevisiae that recognizes "flip recombinase target" (FRT) sites, which are short sequences of DNA, and induces recombination between them. FRT sites have been inserted transgenically near the centromere of each chromosome arm of D. melanogaster. The FLP gene can then be induced selectively, commonly using either the heat shock promoter or the GAL4/UAS system. The resulting clones can be identified either negatively or positively.

In negatively marked clones, the fly is transheterozygous for a gene encoding a visible marker (commonly the green fluorescent protein) and an allele of a gene to be studied (both on chromosomes bearing FRT sites). After induction of FLP expression, cells that undergo recombination will have progeny homozygous for either the marker or the allele being studied. Therefore, the cells that do not carry the marker (which are dark) can be identified as carrying a mutation.

Using negatively marked clones is sometimes inconvenient, especially when generating very small patches of cells, where seeing a dark spot on a bright background is more difficult than a bright spot on a dark background. Creating positively marked clones is possible using the so-called MARCM ("mosaic analysis with a repressible cell marker" system, developed by Liqun Luo, a professor at Stanford University, and his postdoctoral student Tzumin Lee, who now leads a group at Janelia Farm Research Campus. This system builds on the GAL4/UAS system, which is used to express GFP in specific cells. However, a globally expressed GAL80 gene is used to repress the action of GAL4, preventing the expression of GFP. Instead of using GFP to mark the wild-type chromosome as above, GAL80 serves this purpose, so that when it is removed by mitotic recombination, GAL4 is allowed to function, and GFP turns on. This results in the cells of interest being marked brightly in a dark background.

== See also ==
- 45,X/46,XY mosaicism (X0/XY mosaicism)
- Somatic mutation
