= Eunjoon Kim =

South Korean neuroscientist

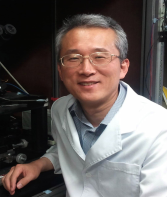
- Born: January 20, 1964 (age 62); South Korea
- Education: Busan National University, KAIST, Michigan State University
- Awards: Asan Award in Medicine
- Scientific career
- Fields: Neuroscience, autism, protein receptors
- Workplaces: KAIST, Institute for Basic Science, Harvard Medical School
- Doctoral advisor: James L. Bennett

Korean name
- Hangul: 김은준
- RR: Gim Eunjun
- MR: Kim Ŭnjun
- Website: IBS Center for Synaptic Brain Dysfunctions

Eunjoon Kim is a professor of KAIST and director of Center for Synaptic Brain Dysfunctions within the Institute for Basic Science (IBS). His current research focuses on molecular mechanisms underlying autism spectrum disorders and synaptic brain dysfunctions. With over 230 publications to his name, his research has been cited over 35,000 times giving him an h-index of 87. He graduated from Busan National University in 1986, received master's degree at KAIST in 1988, received PhD degree at Michigan State University in 1994, and worked at Harvard Medical School as a postdoctoral fellow during 1995-1996. His current research focuses on molecular organization of neuronal synapses and synapse dysfunction-related psychiatric disorders.

== Education ==
- 1982. 3 – 1986. 2 B.S., Dept of Pharmacology, Busan National University, Korea
- 1986. 3 – 1988. 2 M.S., Dept of Biological Engineering, Korea Advanced Institute of Science and Technology (KAIST), Korea
- 1991. 9 – 1994. 12 Ph.D., Dept of Pharmacology and Toxicology, Michigan State University

== Work ==
- 1988. 3 – 1991. 8 Research Associate, Korea Research Institute of Bioscience and Biotechnology, Daejeon, Korea
- 1995. 1 – 1997. 2 Postdoc, Dept of Neurobiology and Howard Hughes Medical Institute, Harvard Medical School.P.I.: Morgan Sheng
- 1997. 3 – 2000. 2 Assistant Professor, Dept of Pharmacology, Busan National University, Korea
- 2000. 3 – 2014 Assistant, Associate, & Full Professor, Dept of Biol. Sci., KAIST, Korea
- 2003. 7 – 2012.5 Director, National Creative Research Initiative Center for Synaptogenesis, Korea
- 2012. 6 – present Director, Center for Synaptic Brain Dysfunctions, Institute for Basic Science, KAIST, Korea

== Awards ==
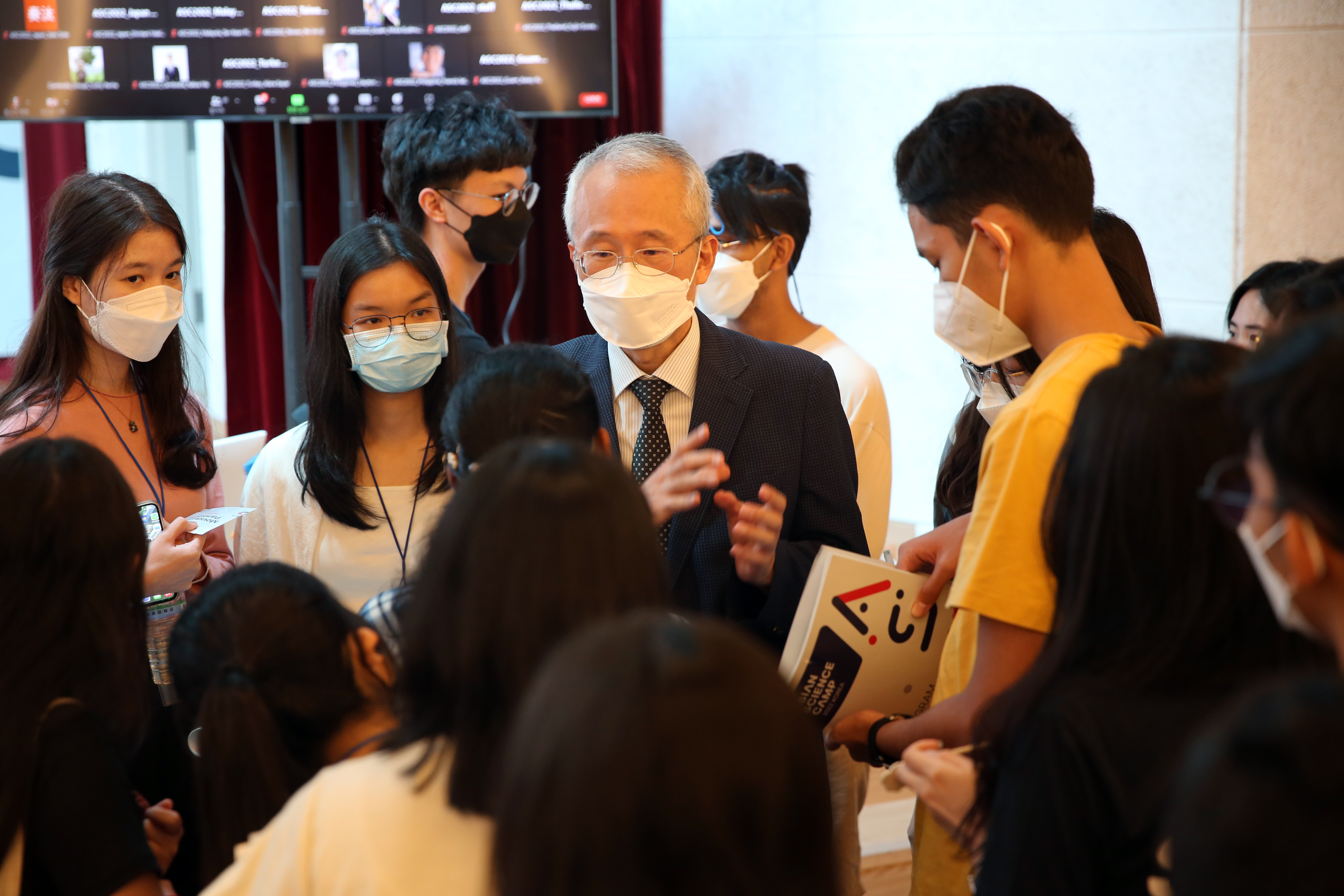
Participants of Asian Science Camp 2022 having discussion with Eunjoon Kim.

- 2018: Asan Award in Medicine, ASAN Foundation
- 2014: KAISTian of the Year, KAIST
- 2013: POSCO TJ Park Prize, POSCO TJ Park Foundation
- 2012: Life Science Award, Korean Society for Molecular Cell Biology
- 2012: Inchon Award, The Dong-A Ilbo
- 2012: Life Science Award, Korean Society for Molecular and Cell Biology
- 2011: Best Research Award, KAIST
- 2005: BPS Award, Korean BioPharmacal Society
- 2004: Young Scientist Award, Korean Academy of Science and Technology
- 2003: Academic Award, KAIST
- 1991: Korean Government Overseas Scholarship, Ministry of Education

== Selected publications ==
  - Kim E, Niethammer M, Rothschild A, Jan YN, Sheng M (2 November 1995). "Clustering of Shaker-type K+ channels by interaction with a family of membrane-associated guanylate kinases". Nature. 378 (6552): 85–88. doi:10.1038/378085a0. PMID 7477295.
  - Roh JD, Jun Y, Jeon H, Kim J, Yi Y, Kim M, Cho H, Oh Y, Moon H, Kim J, Kim S, Ryu J, Kang M, Kim J, Kim Y, Jung Y, Yoo T, Oh H, Kim H, Jin C, Yang Y, Choi G, Ahn S, Kim JY, Kang H, Bae M, Kim E (17 September 2026). "Transcriptome-based classification in mice with ASD-risk mutations". Science. 393 (6817): 1250–1257. doi:10.1126/science.adz6688. PMID 42752124.
  - Won H, Lee HR, Gee HY, Mah W, Kim JI, Lee J, Ha S, Chung C, Jung ES, Cho YS, Park SG, Lee JS, Lee K, Kim D, Bae YC, Kaang BK, Lee MG, Kim E (14 June 2012). "Autistic-like social behaviour in Shank2-mutant mice improved by restoring NMDA receptor function". Nature. 486 (7402): 261–265. doi:10.1038/nature11208. PMID 22699620.
  - Won H, Mah W, Kim E, Kim JW, Hahm EK, Kim MH, Cho S, Kim J, Jang H, Cho SC, Kim BN, Shin MS, Seo J, Jeong J, Choi SY, Kim D, Kang C, Kim E (May 2011). "GIT1 is associated with ADHD in humans and ADHD-like behaviors in mice". Nature Medicine. 17 (5): 566–572. doi:10.1038/nm.2330. PMID 21499268.
  - Chung W, Choi SY, Lee E, Park H, Kang J, Park H, Choi Y, Lee D, Park SG, Kim R, Cho YS, Choi J, Kim MH, Lee JW, Lee S, Rhim I, Jung MW, Kim D, Bae YC, Kim E (March 2015). "Social deficits in IRSp53 mutant mice improved by NMDAR and mGluR5 suppression". Nature Neuroscience. 18 (3): 435–443. doi:10.1038/nn.3927. PMID 25622145.
  - Jung H, Park H, Choi Y, Kang H, Lee E, Kweon H, Roh JD, Ellegood J, Choi W, Kang J, Rhim I, Choi SY, Bae M, Kim SG, Lee J, Chung C, Yoo T, Park H, Kim Y, Ha S, Um SM, Mo S, Kwon Y, Mah W, Bae YC, Kim H, Lerch JP, Paik SB, Kim E (September 2018). "Sexually dimorphic behavior, neuronal activity, and gene expression in Chd8-mutant mice". Nature Neuroscience. 21 (9): 1218–1228. doi:10.1038/s41593-018-0208-z. PMID 30104731.
  - Roh JD, Bae M, Oh Y, Yang Y, Lee S, Hwang WC, Yang E, Kim H, Jang H, Choi HW, Kim H, Kim JY, Kim E (29 May 2026). "Glycine-modulating Slc6a20a-ASO restores NMDA receptor function in SHANK2 and SHANK3-mutant mice and cortical organoids". Nature Communications. 17: 6987. doi:10.1038/s41467-026-73881-9. PMC 13392139. PMID 42215483.

== See also ==
- Morgan Sheng
- Roderick MacKinnon
- Yuh Nung Jan
