= Brose (surname) =

Brose is a surname. Notable people with the surname include:

- Dario Brose (born 1970), American soccer player
- Don Brose (born 1940), American ice hockey coach
- Henry Brose (1890–1965), Australian physicist
- Katja Brose, American neuroscientist
- Richard Brose (1897–1969), Australian politician
