= Guoping Feng =

Chinese-American neuroscientist

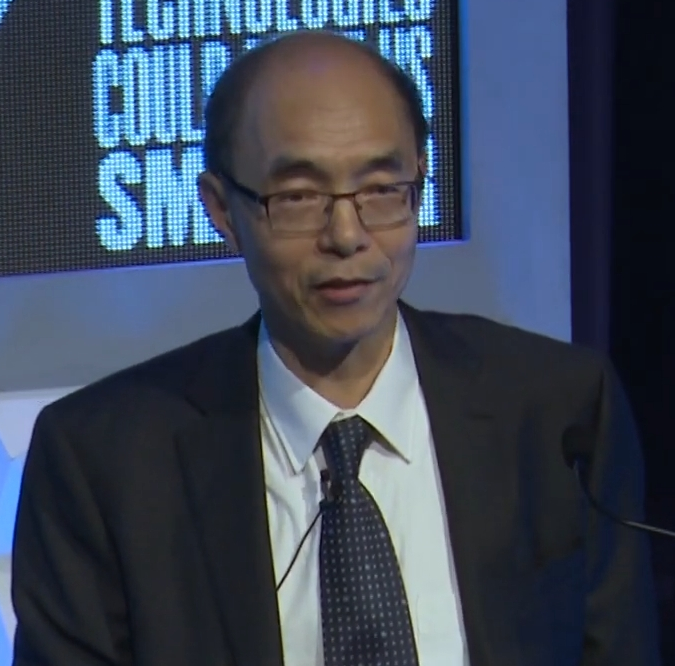
- Guoping Feng in October 2019
- Born: Zhejiang, China
- Education: Zhejiang University (B.M.S. 1982); Shanghai Second Medical University (M.S. 1985); State University of New York at Buffalo (Ph.D. 1994)
- Known for: Animal models of psychiatric disease
- Awards: Beckman Young Investigator Award (2002); McKnight Technological Innovations in Neuroscience Award (2011–2012); Hartwell Individual Biomedical Research Award (2008–2011); Gill Young Investigator Award (2012)
- Scientific career
- Fields: Neurobiology
- Workplaces: Duke University; Massachusetts Institute of Technology; Broad Institute
- Doctoral advisor: Linda Hall

Guoping Feng (Chinese: 冯国平) is a Chinese-American neuroscientist. He is the Poitras Professor of Neuroscience at the McGovern Institute for Brain Research in the Department of Brain and Cognitive Sciences at MIT and member of the Stanley Center for Psychiatric Research at Broad Institute. He is most notable for studying the synaptic mechanisms underlying psychiatric disease. In addition to developing many genetic-based imaging tools for the study of molecular mechanisms in the brain, he has generated and characterized rodent models of obsessive-compulsive disorder, autism spectrum disorders, and schizophrenia. Feng has also shown that some autism-like behaviors can be corrected in adult mice by manipulating the expression of the SHANK3 gene.

== Education ==
Feng received his PhD from SUNY Buffalo. He conducted his postdoctoral work at Washington University School of Medicine. Prior to joining the McGovern Institute in 2010, Feng was a faculty member at Duke University. He is currently the Poitras Professor of Neuroscience and the Director of Model Systems and Neurobiology in the Stanley Center for Psychiatric Research at Broad Institute.

== Research ==
Feng studies mutations of the postsynaptic density (PSD), the protein scaffold which stabilizes neurotransmitter receptors, permits normal function of the synapse, and participates in synaptic plasticity. He has demonstrated that mutations in SAPAP3, a gene primarily expressed in the striatum, are associated with repetitive grooming behaviors in mice, resembling repetitive behaviors observed in obsessive-compulsive disorder (OCD) and autism. SAPAP3's role in the Parkinson's disease, and Huntington's disease. He has also shown that mutations in SHANK3, associated with Phelan McDermid syndrome (PMS), lead to autism-like symptoms such as repetitive behaviors, sensory hyper-sensitivity, and social deficits in mice. In 2016, Feng showed that gene therapy to restore normal SHANK3 function in adult mice could reverse some behavioral symptoms.

Feng also studies rare neurodevelopmental disorders such as Rett syndrome and Williams syndrome. In 2018, Feng and colleague Robert Desimone received a grant of over $2.3 million USD to correct MECP2 mutations, which are the cause of Rett syndrome. In 2019, Feng and Zhigang He demonstrated that increasing myelination with the drug clemastine fumarate could reverse myelin deficits and hypersociability symptoms in mice lacking GTF2I, which may be translatable to human patients.

== Awards and honors ==
- Beckman Young Investigator Award (2002)
- Hartwell Individual Biomedical Research Award, Hartwell Foundation (2008–2011)
- McKnight Technological Innovations in Neuroscience Award, McKnight Foundation (2011–2012)
- Gill Young Investigator Award, Gill Center for Biomolecular Science at Indiana University Bloomington (2012)
- Elected member, American Academy of Arts and Sciences (2019)
- Elected to the National Academy of Medicine (2023)

== Selected publications ==
- Barak B, Zhang Z, Liu Y, Nir A, Trangle SS, Ennis M, Levandowski KM, Wang D, Quast K, Boulting GL, Li Y, Bayarsaihan D, He Z & Feng G. (2019) Neuronal deletion of Gtf2i, associated with Williams syndrome, causes behavioral and myelin alterations rescuable by a remyelinating drug. Nature Neuroscience.
- Mei Y, Monteiro P, Zhou Y, Kim J, Gao X, Fu Z, Feng G. (2016) Adult restoration of Shank3 expression rescues selective autistic-like phenotypes. Nature 530: 481–484
- Peça J, Feliciano C, Ting JT, Wang W, Wells MF, Venkatraman TN, Lascola CD, Fu Z, Feng G. (2012) Shank3 mutant mice display autistic-like behaviours and striatal dysfunction. Nature 472: 437–442
- Welch JM, Lu J, Rodriguiz RM, Trotta NC, Peca J, Ding J-D, Feliciano C, Chen M, Adams JP, Luo J, Dudek SM, Weinberg RJ, Calakos N, Wetsel WC, Feng G. (2007) Cortico-striatal synaptic defects and OCD-like behaviors in SAPAP3 mutant mice. Nature 448: 894–900
- Feng G et al. (2000) Imaging Neuronal Subsets in Transgenic Mice Expressing Multiple Spectral Variants of GFP. Neuron 28: 41–51
