= Gladys Bryson =

American sociologist and professor (1894–1952)

Gladys Bryson, Ph.D.
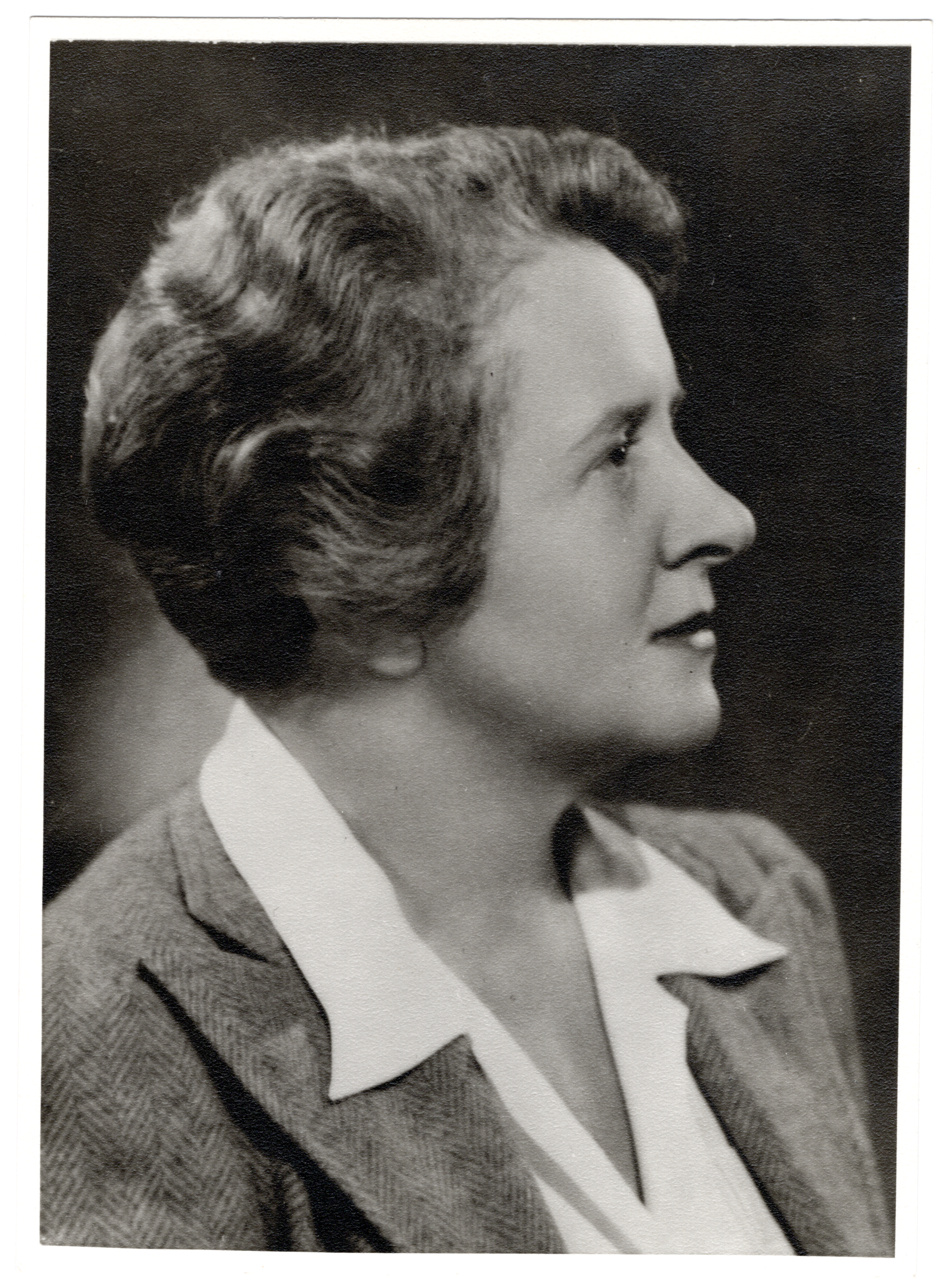
- Gladys Eugenia Bryson, Smith College c1945
- Born: Gladys Eugenia Bryson; April 2, 1894; Carlisle, Kentucky
- Died: December 18, 1952 (aged 58); Northampton, Massachusetts
- Occupation: Professor
- Known for: Advocacy for international students in the U.S.; Scholarship of sociological theories and frameworks

Gladys Eugenia Bryson (April 2, 1894 – December 18, 1952) was the Mary Huggins Gamble Professor of Sociology and chairman of the Sociology Department at Smith College. She was a human rights activist from an early age and a national leader on issues relating to international students in the U.S.

== Early life ==
Gladys Eugenia Bryson was born in Carlisle, Kentucky, to Minnie Mann and Homer Buell Bryson. She had at least three siblings - these were named in her obituary: Harold, Professor of Music at Oberlin College; Theodore, of St. Petersburg Beach, Fla., and Paul, of Cincinnati. Bryson was a student at Georgetown College at the time she wrote a prize-winning essay on women's suffrage, and she would go on to graduate with an A.B. in 1918.

From 1919 to 1925, Bryson served as the national secretary with the student council of the national board of the Young Women's Christian Association. Her address was New York, NY, in the University of California, Berkeley Register for 1926-27 when she was enrolled there for a master's degree in Social Institutions.

She graduated from UC Berkeley in 1927 and was named a Sterling Fellow at Yale University during the 1927–1928 academic year. She continued on at UC Berkeley with her PhD studies. She was the founding director of the International House Berkeley in 1930–31. Her doctoral thesis for graduation in 1930 was “The Influence of Scottish Moral Philosophers upon the Social Sciences.”

== Professional life ==
Bryson was hired to teach at Smith College in 1931. She was appointed chairman of the Department of Sociology in 1945, and served as faculty resident of Lawrence House. Three years later she was appointed chairman of the Division of Social Sciences. She was honored with the named seat of the Mary Huggins Gamble Professor of Sociology at Smith College.

In 1941, Bryson was appointed as member of a national advisory committee on the "adjustment of foreign students in the United States." This committee worked for the Division of Cultural Relations (now named the Bureau of Educational and Cultural Affairs) of the United States Department of State. In 1942 she was part of a conference of representatives from over 100 colleges and universities that explored the policy of government and academic institutions' interactions with international students.

In 1944, Bryson used her home in the San Fernando neighborhood to start up a primary school called the Colegio Anglo-Americano de Cali. By 1950, the school had greatly expanded and was renamed Colegio Bolivar. She served as President of the Eastern Sociological Society from 1946 to 1947.

== Writings ==
- Prize-winning Women's Suffrage Essay The Georgetown Times (May 17, 1916).
- "The Comparable Interests of the Old Moral Philosophy and the Modern Social Sciences," Social Forces, Vol. 11, No. 1 (Oct. 1932), pp. 19–27.
- "Some Eighteenth-Century Conceptions of Society," The Sociological Review Volume a31, Issue 4 (Oct. 1939), pp. 401–421.
- Man and Society: The Scottish Inquiry of the 18th Century, Princeton University Press, 1945.

== Death ==
Bryson grew ill while working at Smith College. She was also in the process of writing a book on the foundations of American sociology. She died on December 18, 1952, in the college infirmary. She was 58 years old. Her body was returned to her mother's home in Cynthiana, Kentucky (her father had predeceased her), and she was buried in the cemetery there.

== Sources ==
- Gladys Eugenia Bryson Papers. Smith College Archives Repository, CA-MS-00338, Northampton, Massachusetts.
- Bryson, Gladys: Man and Society; Princeton University Press Records, C0728, Manuscripts Division, Department of Special Collections, Princeton University Library, Princeton, New Jersey.
- Correspondence with Arthur Oncken Lovejoy; Arthur Oncken Lovejoy papers, MS-0038. Special Collections, Johns Hopkins Libraries, Baltimore, Maryland.
