= Asian Science Camp =

Annual forum for Asian science students

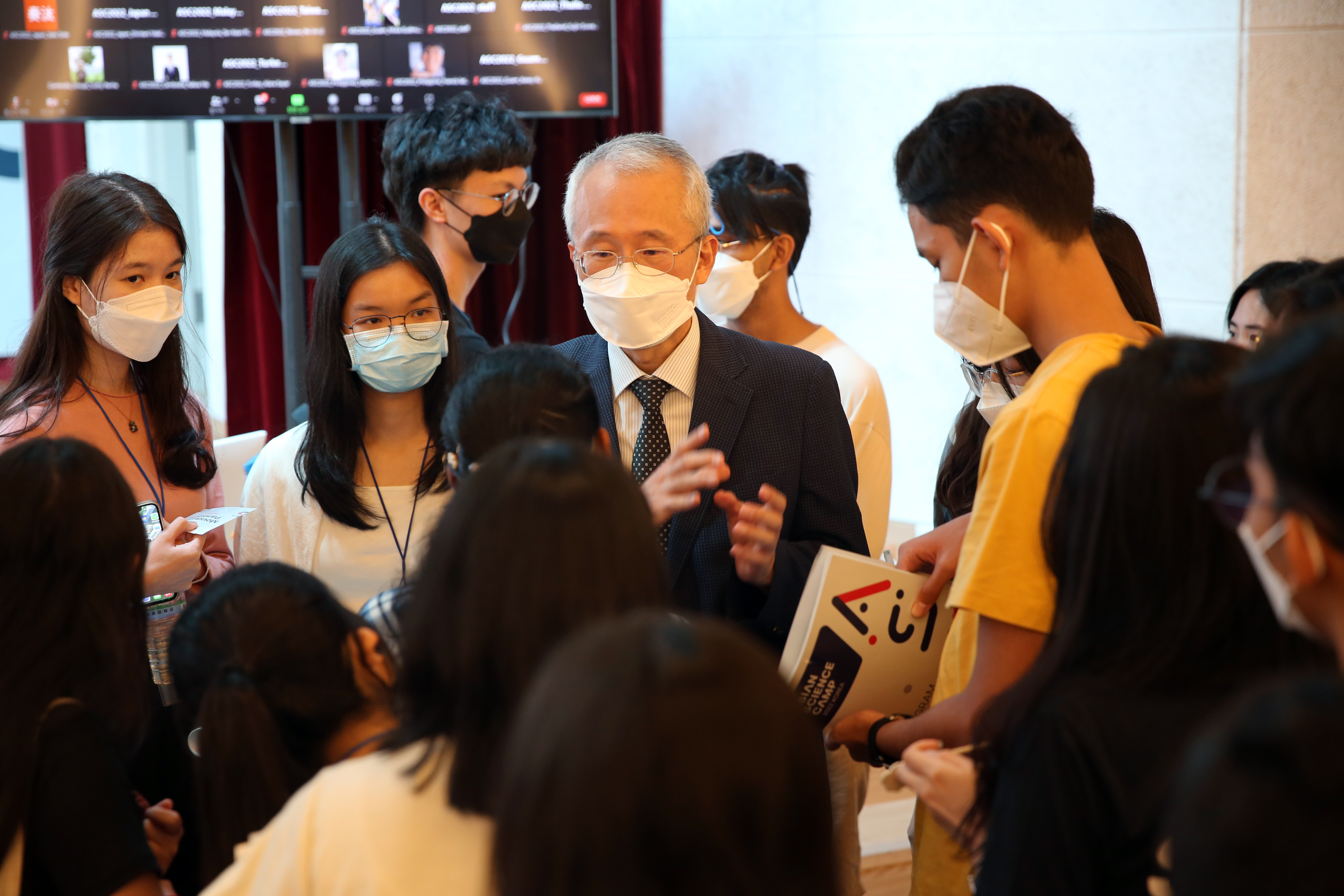
Participants of Asian Science Camp 2022 having discussion with Kim Eunjoon.

The Asian Science Camp (ASC) is an annual forum for pre-collegiate and college students which aims at promoting discussion and cooperation among Asian students for the betterment of science in the Asian region. The first ASC was held at Taipei in 2007, and was subsequently held at Bali in 2008, Tsukuba in 2009, Mumbai in 2010, Daejeon in 2011, and Jerusalem in 2012, among others. This idea of an annual camp was co-proposed by Yuan Tseh Lee and Masatoshi Koshiba at the 2005 Lindau Nobel Laureate Meeting. The ASC is modeled after the Lindau meetings.

== Background ==
The idea of the Asian Science Camp was co-proposed in September 2005 after the 55th Annual meeting of Nobel Laureates and Students in Lindau, Germany, by Professor Yuan Tseh Lee (1986 Nobel Laureate in Chemistry) from Chinese Taipei, and Professor Masatoshi Koshiba (2002 Nobel Laureate in Physics) from Japan. The proposal expressed the aim to enlighten science talented youths through discussions and dialogues with top scholars in the world, and promoting international friendship and cooperation among best young students of the next generation in Asia. The Lindau Meetings will serve as a model. The Asian Science Camp would invite a dozen Nobel Laureates or world-distinguished scientists as speakers and devise an interesting program to attract all the participants, including plenary sessions, round table discussions, student master dialogues, a creative poster competition, social events and excursion. The working language would be English. This proposal was soon discussed in a board meeting of the Wu Chien-Shiung Education Foundation and was approved unanimously by the board.

The governing body of the Asian Science Camp is the International Board of Asian Science Camp (IBASC). IBASC is a not-for-profit organization, consisting of non-governmental educational institutions. The 2007 Asian Science Camp was organized by the Wu Chien-Shiung Education Foundation with the assistance of Academia Sinica. This non-government Foundation was established in 1995 to commemorate the monumental contributions of Madame Dr. Wu Chien-Shiung to physics and her lifelong love for science education. Since its inauguration in Taiwan in August 2007, the Asian Science Camp has become an international annual event in Asia.

== Host countries ==
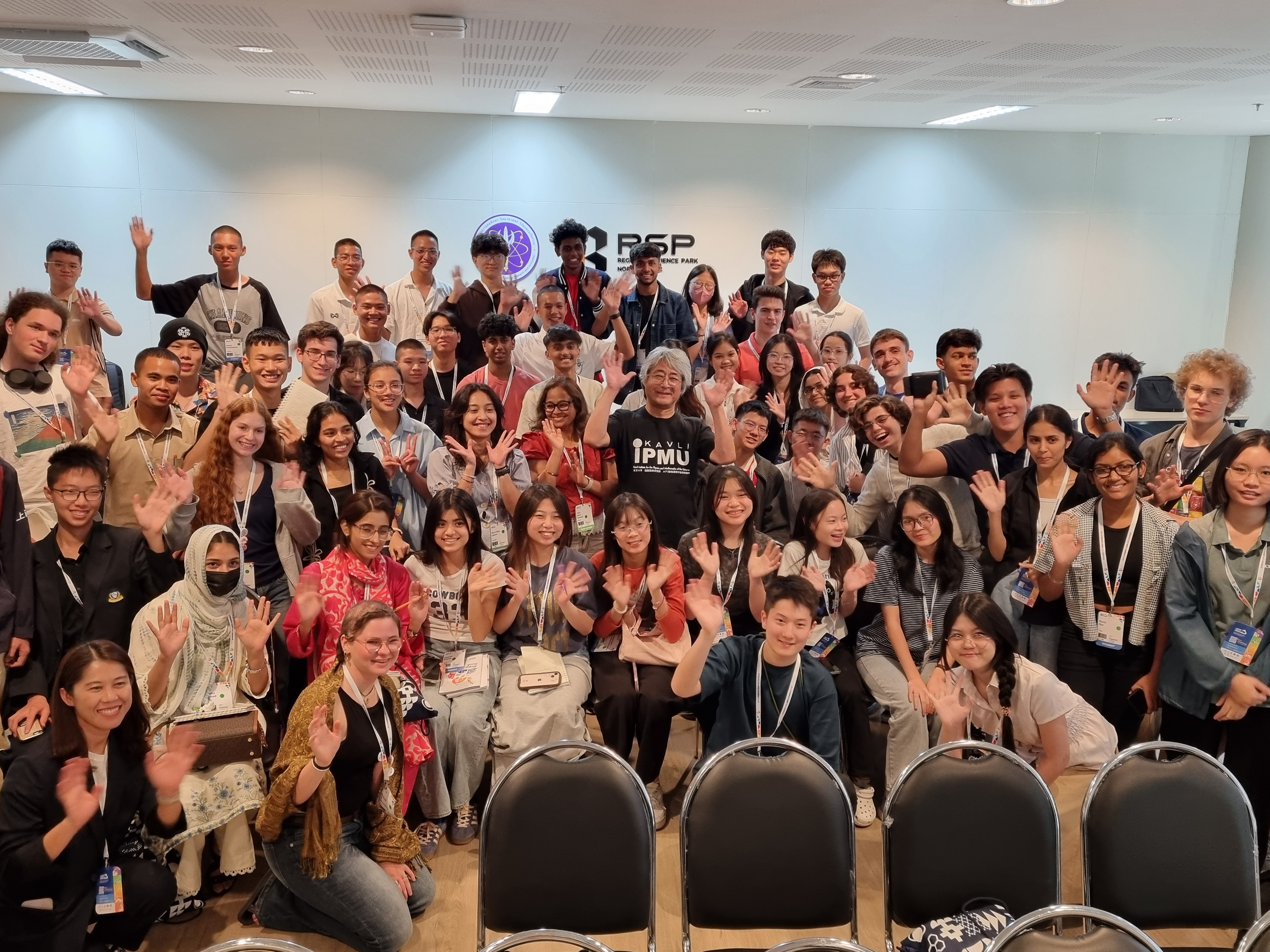
Hitoshi Murayama poses with participants of Asian Science Camp 2025 during a breakout session.

2026 - Hong Kong, China

2025 - Nakhon Ratchasima Province, Thailand

2024 - Not held

2023 - Not held

2022 - Daejeon, South Korea

2021 - Postponed due to COVID-19

2020 - Postponed due to COVID-19

2019 - Shantou, China

2018 - Manado, Indonesia

2017 - Kampar, Malaysia

2016 - Bengaluru, India

2015 - Bangkok, Thailand

2014 - Singapore

2013 - Tsukuba, Japan

2012 - Jerusalem, Israel

2011 - Daejeon, South Korea

2010 - Tsukuba, Japan

2009 - Mumbai, India

2008 - Bali, Indonesia

2007 - Taipei, Taiwan

== Camps by year ==
=== ASC 2007 ===
The first Asian Science Camp was held at Taipei, Taiwan in August 2007. It was organized by the Wu Chien Shiung Foundation with assistance from Academia Sinica. Around 400 students and five Noble Laureates attended this event. The event was supported and funded by Ministry of Education, National Science Council, Academia Sinica, National Women's League of the R.O.C., Macronix International Co., Taiwan Semiconductor Manufacture Company Ltd., Hewlett-Packard Company, MediaTek Inc., Powerchip Semiconductor Corp., Li Ching Cultural and Education Foundation.

=== ASC 2012 ===
The sixth Asian Science Camp took place in the Hebrew University Safra Campus, Jerusalem in 2012. Hosted by Israel, it had the largest number of students compared to previous years. Approximately 300 students, 5 Nobel Prize recipients, and 20 leading experts attended the event.

=== ASC 2015 ===
The ninth Asian Science Camp was held in August 2015. The camp was hosted by Thailand and organized by the Promotion of Academic Olympiad and Development of Science Education Foundation (POSN) to celebrate the 60th birthday of H.R.H. Princess Maha Chakri Sirindhorn. ASC 2015 was held at Sirindhorn Science Home and Thailand Science Park Convention Center of the National Science and Technology Development Agency, Pathum Thani and co-hosted by the Ministry of Education, Ministry of Science and Technology, Ministry of Foreign Affairs, Science Society of Thailand under Royal Patronage, and the Institute for the Promotion of Teaching Science and Technology. 255 students from 28 countries including 40 from Thailand, attended along with their leadership. Plenary lectures were given by Yuan T Lee, Robert Huber, Harald zur Hausen, Ada Yonath, Vladimir Voevodsky, Hitoshi Murayama and Yongyuth Yuthavong.

=== ASC 2016 ===
The tenth Asian Science Camp was jointly organised by the Department of Science and Technology of India and the Indian Institute of Science in August 2016. The venue for the program was J. N. Tata Auditorium, Indian Institute of Science and the program was divided into academic programs and sightseeing and excursions.

=== ASC 2022 ===
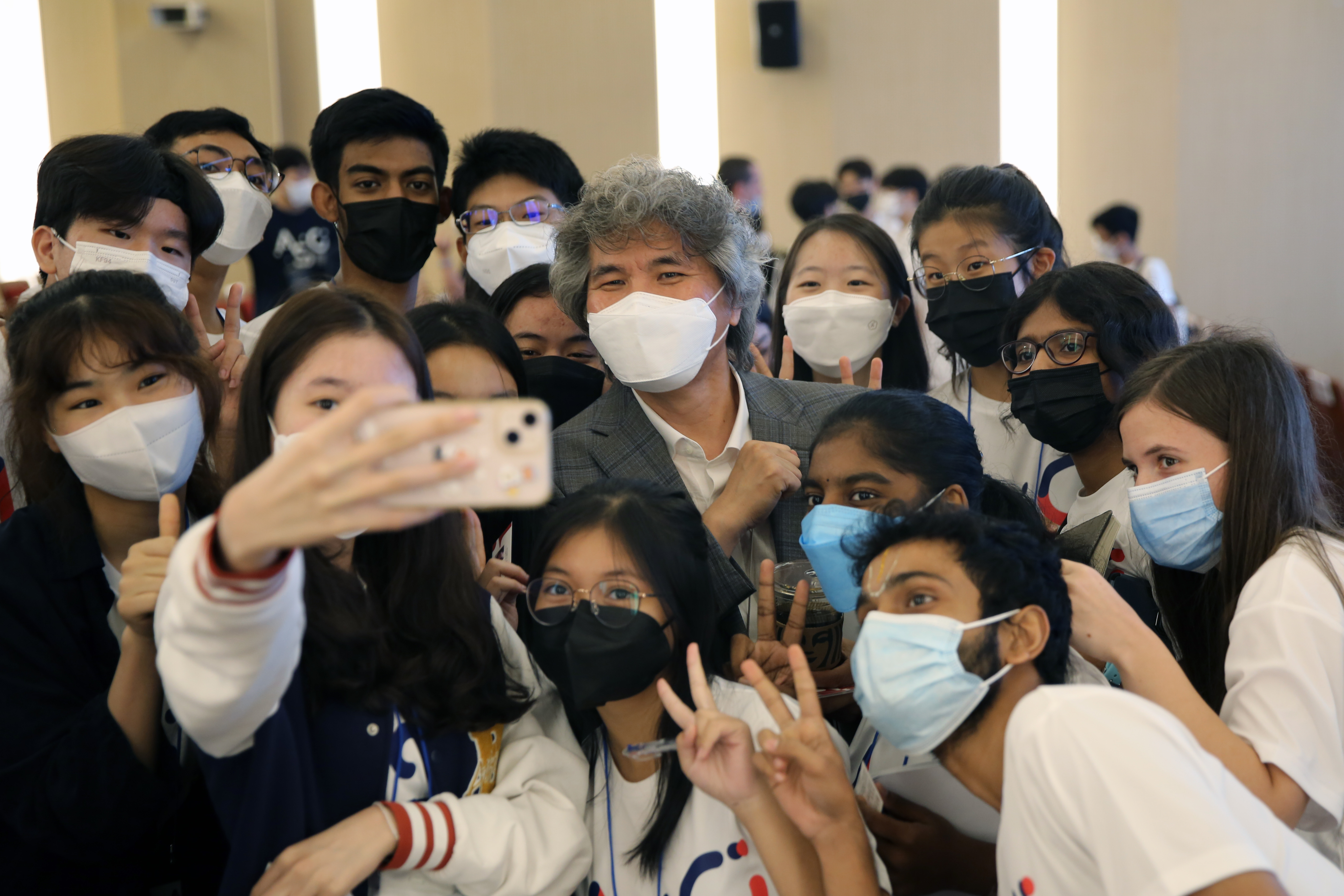
Participants take a picture with neuroscientist Changjoon Justin Lee.

After a two-year delay due to the COVID-19 pandemic, the fourteenth Asian Science Camp was held in 2022 in Daejeon, South Korea. This was the first hybrid offline and online conference and had 250 participants from 25 countries. The primary venue was the Science Culture Center at the Institute for Basic Science. Around 20 researchers participated in lectures and panel discussions. Video lectures were given by Nobel Prize laureates Stefan Hell, Tim Hunt and Randy Schekman followed by a Q&A session for each speaker. Others speakers include Axel Timmermann, Kevin Insik Hahn, Kim Young-Kee, Taeghwan Hyeon, Kim Eunjoon, Oh Yong-Geun, Changjoon Justin Lee, V. Narry Kim, and Sergej Flach. A panel discussion on dark matter was led by Yannis Semertzidis with Chung Woohyun and Youn SungWoo as panelists. A virus panel was chaired by Choi Young Ki with Shin Eui-Cheol, Jang Hee-Chang and Kim Woo-Joo as members.
