= Colegio Bolivar =

Colegio Bolívar

Location
- Cl 5a #122-21; Cali; Colombia

Information
- Type: Private
- Established: 1947
- Director: Dr. Joseph Nagy
- Accreditation: Cognia (AdvancED)
- Yearbook: Kiosko
- Information: +57 2 4855050
- Website: Colegio Bolivar Website

Colegio Bolivar is a private, non–denominational, American school located in Cali, Colombia.

Founded in 1947 to serve the dependents of expatriate personnel assigned to Cali, the school's population has shifted over the years from a majority of expatriate students to a majority of Colombian nationals.

The community, including just over 1,300 students, is divided into four school sections: Preprimary, Primary, Middle, and High. Each is led by its own principal and has its own faculty and facilities. The school, whose primary language of instruction is English, is college preparatory, with almost 99% of the graduates continuing onto higher education in Colombia and abroad. The school is one of the most expensive schools in Colombia and as well in Latin America.

Located on a thirty-five acre campus at the foothills of the Andes, Colegio Bolivar consists of ten classroom blocks, a science building, a library/media center, an auditorium, a gymnasium, a swimming pool, a cafeteria, an administration area, several athletic fields, and a great deal of open space. Cali's weather allows for the unusual feature of truly "open" classrooms: the rooms themselves have only three walls, with the fourth open to the outdoors.

== History ==
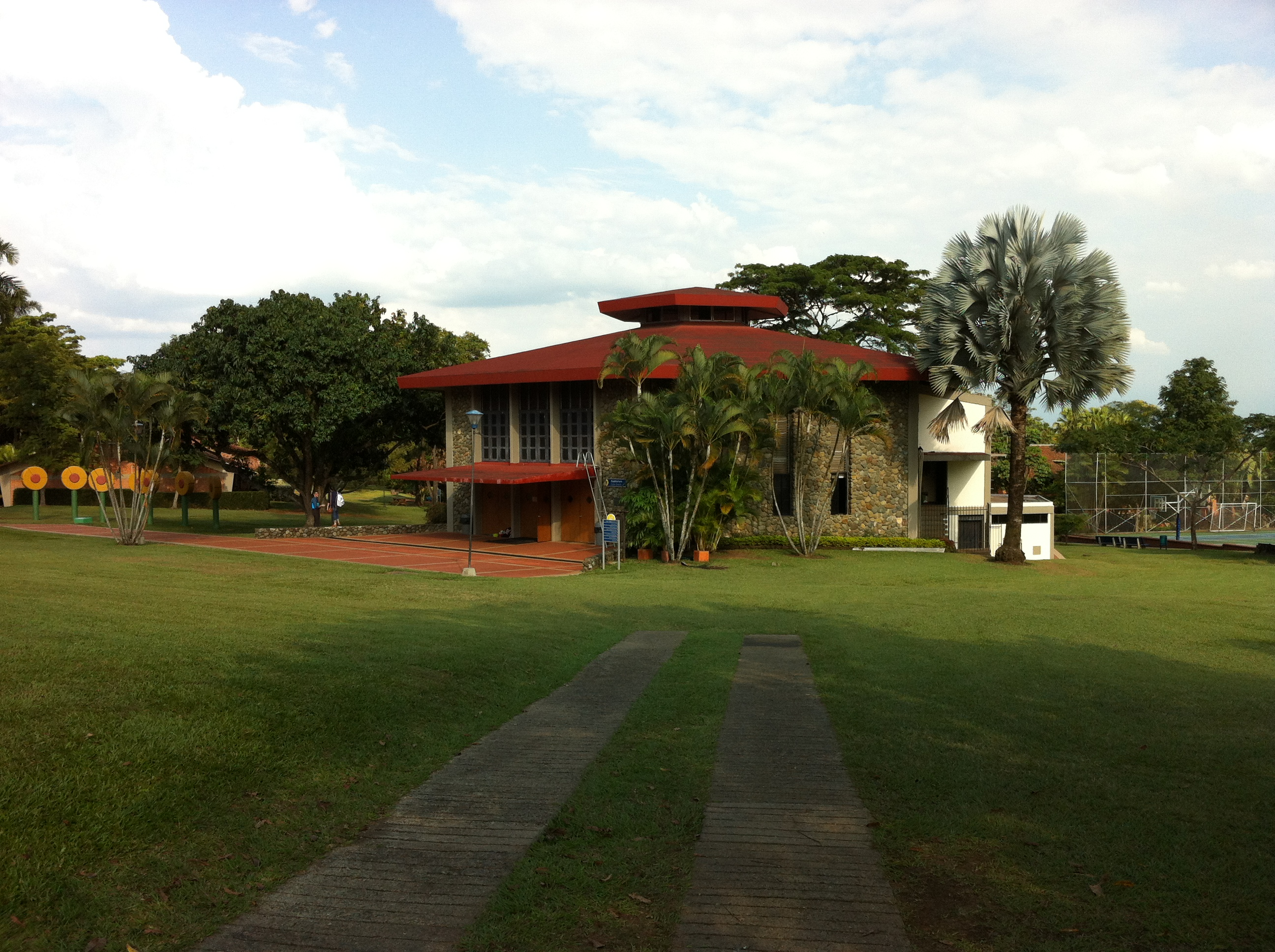
Colegio Bolivar's green campus, featuring the Dale Swall auditorium.

In 1944, Gladys Bryson, a foreign resident of California and educator by profession, converted a room of her home in the San Fernando neighborhood into a classroom. This is how the Colegio Anglo-Americano de Cali was born. In 1947, the school had students through the eighth grade and the tuition was $20 pesos for first through eighth grades and $15 pesos for kindergarten. Since the name Colegio Anglo-Americano de Cali was very similar to that of the Colegio Americano, it was officially changed to Colegio Bolívar in 1950. In 1955 each student brought his/her own desk. A kiosk was also built which the students used during their breaks and lunches. Years later, a larger one was built and while the school grew to almost 300 students, the kiosks were used as classrooms.

With a donation from the United States, in 1960 a parcel of land of 18 acres was acquired for the construction of buildings. In 1961, the school received the SACS-CASI accreditation. In 1963, with a total of 600 students and under the direction of Mr. Dale Swall, the school moved to Pance, where it is still located today, and six blocks for classrooms and basic general services were constructed. In one of the editions of "The Liberator", the school newspaper of these times, there was an article from one of the students describing his experience in the new facilities; he expressed that the move to the new lot produced a type of chaos, since none of the students knew it well, so no one knew where to go to find their classes. This same year was the initiation of the traditional Sport´s Day. Besides "The Liberator", the school also had a Science Club, a Photography Club and several choirs. In these years, when skirts were worn with tennis shoes and glasses had thick dark frames, there were parties like the Valentine´s Dance, where the twist was primarily danced. The tuition was $225 pesos and the bus cost $30 pesos (the buses were blue and white). In 1969, the Swall Auditorium was built.

In this time of flared pants, head scarves, and ankle socks, the John Lee Gymnasium was built in 1972, which was initially thought to be used as a cafeteria. Sports such as golf and tennis were being played and there was also a student government for both Middle School and High School established. There were also other activities such as the Chess Club, Scouts and the Band. In 1976 the Science Laboratory (G Block) was finished and in December 1978, the new cafeteria was opened. In 1979, the swimming pool was inaugurated and the soccer field was built. In the same year the library was begun in the G block where they were currently teaching the 5th grade and had the History, English and Ethics classes for secondary students.

These were the years of neon colors, tube pants rolled up at the bottom, betamaxes and minicomputers. The difference from today was that in the 80s the parking lot was where the library is currently and extended itself to the administration block. Also in this area there were two lakes filled with a variety of fish, tadpoles and snails. In previous years the food offered at the school was from a snack food company. The cafeteria, which currently exists, began in 1984. At this time a hamburger cost $200 pesos, a hot dog or a slice of pizza cost $100 pesos, a complete lunch $300 pesos and a soda $25 pesos. Before the students purchased tickets in order to buy their food, but for the convenience of the students, they can now use either tickets or money.

In 1992 the current parking lot and library were built and in 1994 the Science Building, which consists of the Biology, Chemistry and Physics labs, was inaugurated. In this decade many improvements were made such as the Music Room for pre-primary, bathrooms at the soccer field, drinking fountains and an ecological park next to the river. There were also some changes done to the cafeteria, such as taking down the traditional kiosks and adding a roof and tables as well as adding the pre-primary cafeteria. As far as sports, soccer and volleyball were mainly played. Other organizations were formed like the Student Council, the Tribuna newspaper team, a Values Committee and an Ecological group.

All the classrooms, five computer labs, the administrative offices and specialized areas are equipped with computers, all connected to one solid data network and internet.

=== Directors ===
- Gladys Bryson (1944 – 1946)
- Elizabeth Cooper (1947)
- Dorothy B. Hawkins (1949)
- Donald R. Thomas (1951 – 1954)
- George P. Young (1954 – 1958)
- Dale Swall(1958 – 1970)
- Alvin Foder (1970 – 1971)
- Dr. Phyllis Mullenax (1972 – 1976)
- Joe D. Winger (1976 – 1978)
- Dr. Curtis Harvey (1978 – 1984)
- Dr. Martin A. Felton (1984 – 2003)
- Dr. Joseph Nagy (2003 – present)

== Notable alumni ==
- Ricardo Dolmetsch (1986)
- Fanny Lu (1992)
- Andrés Baiz (1994)
- Ricardo Cobo
- Mateo de Angulo (2008)
- Gustavo Yacamán (2008)
- Gabriela Tafur (2012)
- Nicole Regnier (2014)

== Academics ==
Colegio Bolívar is accredited by the Southern Association of Colleges and Schools and the Colombian Ministry of Education. Both the US High School and the Colombian Bachillerato programs are offered, and diplomas are awarded for each.

The 105 faculty members, 16 teaching assistants and seven administrators of whom 46% are North Americans and third country, and 54% Colombian. Nearly 80% are either native English speakers or have near native fluency. Twenty-five of the faculty are "import" teachers, those brought specifically from the U.S. for employment with Colegio Bolivar. The staff includes twenty one master's degrees and five PhD's.

This is an English language school, beginning with English as a Second Language in the pre-school (K4 and K5) and early elementary school. While all students have at least one hour of Spanish language study daily, virtually all other academic classes are taught in English. By upper elementary school, the students are all academically bilingual. Traditionally, some 20-30% of the graduates attend universities in the United States where they matriculate as any North American would, with none of the special requirements of the average foreign student.

== College Preparation ==
It also offers the Advanced Placement program, which is a set of rigorous, college-level courses that prepare a student for future studies. Aside from these, it also offers other classes that engage students to exploit their skills. The following is a list of courses and extracurricular activities offered by the school:

=== Advanced Placement ===
Colegio Bolivar offers the Advanced Placement program, which allows students in grades 10, 11, and 12 to take rigorous, college-level courses, for them to be prepared for higher education. The school offers the following AP courses: AP Biology, AP Chemistry, AP Physics I, AP Physics II, AP Calculus AB, AP Psychology, AP English Literature and Composition, AP English Language and Composition, AP Spanish Literature and Culture, AP Spanish Language and Culture, AP European History, AP United States Government and Politics, AP Comparative Government and Politics. Additionally, the school allows students to take AP courses not offered in-site through the online platform K-12 international.

Students that have taken the AP exams, have scored above the United States national average: 13%-15% of the students score a 5 (extremely well qualified), 18%-22% score a 4 (well qualified), 32%-36% score a 3 (qualified), and 32%-36% score below a 2 (possibly qualified). These scores are taken by the universities to give the students college credit.

=== TOEFL ===
The TOEFL test is an English proficiency test that is given to international students to test their level. Colegio Bolivar's average score has stayed between 98 and 102 points out of the possible 120 points. The minimum score needed to enter a university in the United States is 80 points.

=== ICFES ===
Seniors at Colegio Bolívar are required to take the ICFES (the comprehensive university entrance examination), given by the Colombian Ministry of Education each April. Colegio Bolivar's average test results have consistently placed in the first decile (categoría Muy Superior), which is the highest category. Usually, 20%-25% of the students score in the top 20 places, and many of those achieve perfect scores.

=== ACT ===
The average ACT composite score of Colegio Bolivar students that have taken the test is 24-25, which is approximately 4-5 points more than the United States' national average, and above the 75th percentile.

=== SAT ===
The average SAT scores of Colegio Bolivar students that have taken the test are 565-575 on the Mathematics section and 540-550 on the critical reading and writing section. The average overall score is 1115, which is approximately 115 more points than the United States' national average score, and above the 70th percentile.

== University Acceptances ==
In the last five years, between 28% and 42% of Bolivar's graduates carry out their undergraduate studies outside of Colombia, mostly in the United States. Of those who remain in Colombia to study, between 51% and 63% do so in Bogotá. Additionally, each year there is a group of about 11% who do a foreign exchange, and/or study a third language abroad before starting their undergraduate studies. Between 40% and 50% of the seniors receive merit scholarships or financial aid. The total amount offered to the students oscillates between US$3,500,000 and US$4,600,000, including that offered by Colombian universities.
