= Stanley Center for Psychiatric Research =

Biomedical research program in Cambridge, Massachusetts, USA

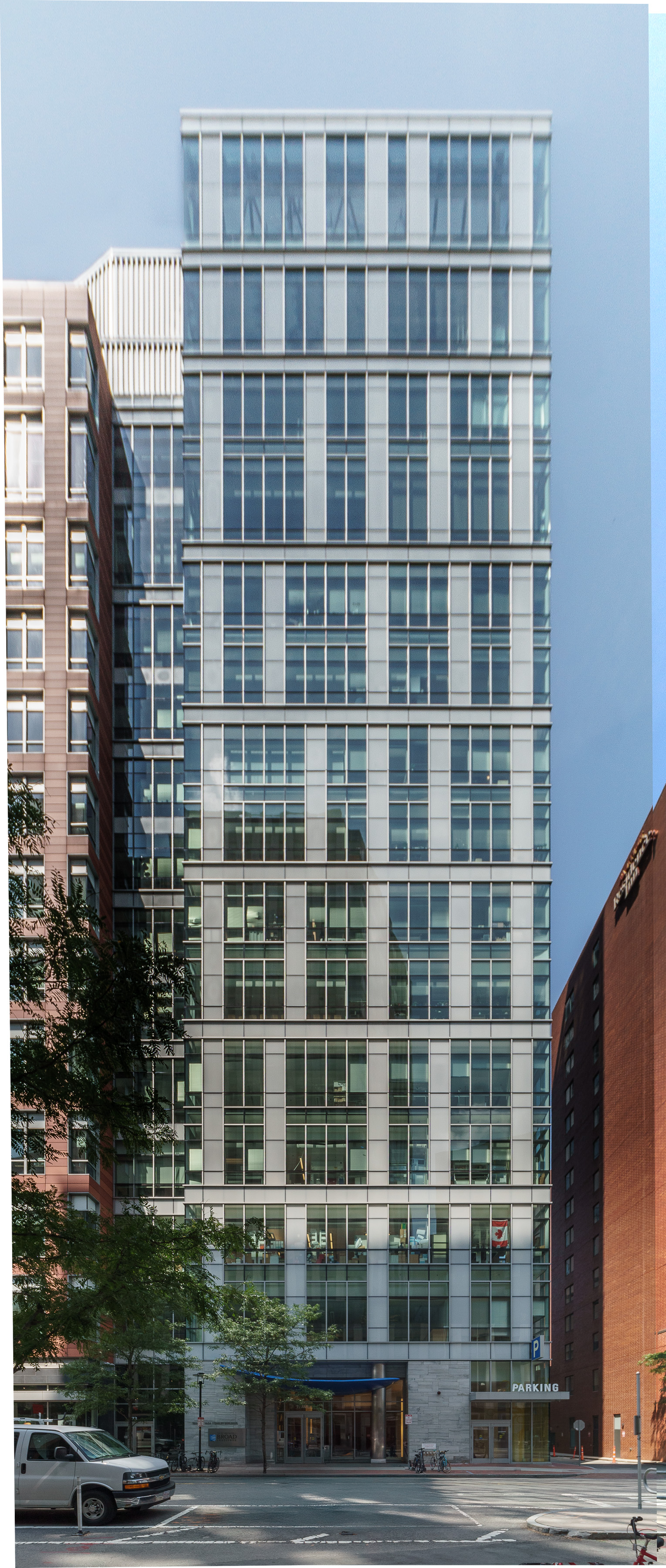
- Established: 2007
- Research type: Basic (non-clinical) and translational research
- Field of research: Genomics, Bioinformatics, Biomedicine, Psychiatric medicine
- Director: Steven Hyman, Morgan Sheng
- Address: The Ted and Vada Stanley Building, 75 Ames Street, Cambridge, Massachusetts 02142
- Location: Cambridge, Massachusetts
- Affiliations: Massachusetts Institute of Technology; Harvard University; Boston Children's Hospital; Brigham and Women's Hospital; Massachusetts General Hospital; McLean Hospital

The Stanley Center for Psychiatric Research at Broad Institute of MIT and Harvard is a multi-disciplinary biomedical research program located in Cambridge, Massachusetts that studies the biological basis of psychiatric disease.

The center was founded in 2007 with funding from philanthropists Ted and Vada Stanley.

== History ==
The Stanley Center for Psychiatric Research at Broad Institute was launched in 2007 with Edward Scolnick, M.D., former head of research and development at Merck Research Laboratories, as its founding director.

Within a year of its inception, researchers at the center and their international collaborators published a paper on their analysis of a collection of more than 7,000 genetic samples for schizophrenia. The center later launched efforts to collect and sequence genetic samples for such conditions as bipolar disorder, autism spectrum disorders (ASDs) and attention deficit hyperactivity disorder (ADHD), in addition to schizophrenia.

In early 2012, Scolnick stepped down as director and became the Stanley Center's chief scientist. Steven Hyman, M.D., former director of the National Institute of Mental Health and former provost of Harvard University, was named director of the center.

In July 2014, the Broad Institute announced that Ted Stanley had committed an additional $650 million to the center. The commitment – the largest ever made for psychiatric research—was aimed at "enhancing scientific research on psychiatric disorders with the hopes of leading to a breakthrough in new treatments."

The announcement coincided with the publication of a paper by Stanley Center researchers and collaborators, as part of the Psychiatric Genomics Consortium, that identified over 100 regions in the human genome associated with schizophrenia through the genetic analysis of 110,000 cases and controls.

== Organizational structure ==
The Center consists of more than 150 scientists from the Broad Institute and the Broad's partner institutions (MIT, Harvard, and Harvard-affiliated hospitals). These include:

- Harvard University Faculty of Arts and Sciences; Harvard Medical School; and Harvard T.H. Chan School of Public Health
- Massachusetts Institute of Technology (MIT)
- Boston Children's Hospital
- Brigham and Women's Hospital
- Massachusetts General Hospital
- McLean Hospital

Affiliated researchers come from multiple fields and disciplines including genetics, computational biology, neurobiology, stem cell biology, biochemistry, medicinal chemistry, and clinical psychiatry.

Researchers at the Stanley Center also collaborate with investigators in various consortia and institutions, including:

- Cardiff University School of Medicine, UK
- Icahn School of Medicine at Mount Sinai
- Karolinska Institute, Sweden
- University of North Carolina School of Medicine
- University of Southern California

== Leadership ==
The current leadership of the Stanley Center for Psychiatric Research consists of:

Directors	Steven Hyman, Morgan Sheng
Chief Scientist Emeritus	Edward Scolnick
Administrative Director	Lynn Harwell
Director, Genetics	Steven McCarroll
Director, Population Genetics	Benjamin Neale
Director, Model Systems and Neurobiology	Guoping Feng
Director, Stem Cell Biology	Kevin Eggan
Director, Translational Neurobiology	Jen Pan
Director, Translational Research	Jeff Cottrell
Director, Medicinal Chemistry	Florence Wagner
Director, Viral Vector Engineering	Ben Deverman

== Facilities ==
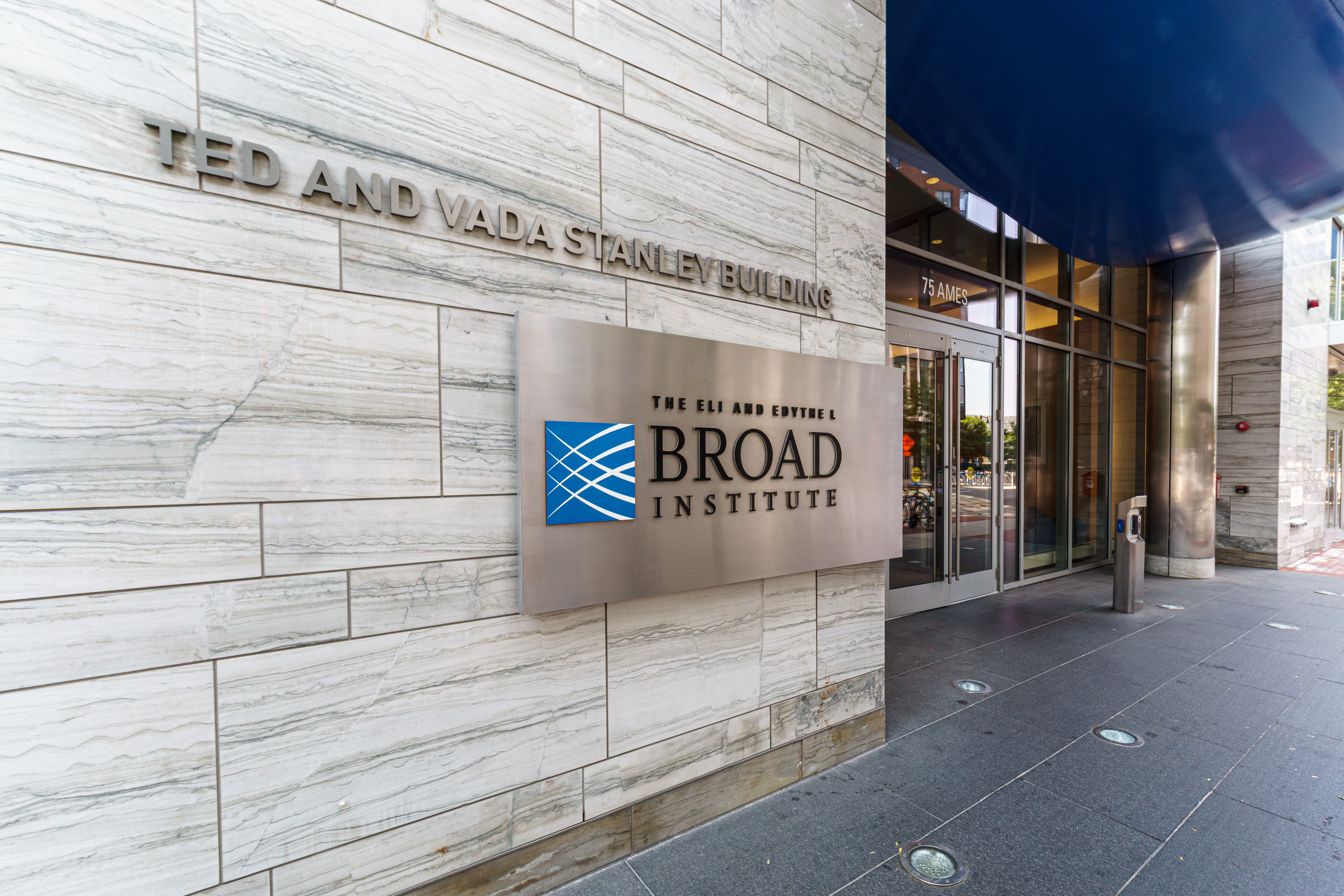
Ted and Vada Stanley Building

The Stanley Center for Psychiatric Research is based at 75 Ames Street in Cambridge, Massachusetts. The building at 75 Ames Street opened in May 2014 and became the workplace of 800 Broad researchers. The building was named "The Ted and Vada Stanley Building" in September 2014.

== Research ==
Publications authored by researchers from the Stanley Center for Psychiatric Research include:

- The Network and Pathway Analysis Subgroup of the Psychiatric Genomics Consortium. Psychiatric genome-wide association study analyses implicate neuronal, immune and histone pathways. Nature Neuroscience. Online 19 January 2015. DOI: 10.1038/nn.3922
- Schizophrenia Working Group of the Psychiatric Genomics Consortium. Biological insights from 108 schizophrenia-associated genetic loci. Nature. 2014 Jul 24;511(7510):421-7. doi: 10.1038/nature13595.
- McCarroll SA, Feng G, Hyman SE. Genome-scale neurogenetics: Methodology and meaning. Nat Neurosci. 2014 Jun;17(6):756-63. doi: 10.1038/nn.3716.
- Hyman, SE. Perspective: Revealing molecular secrets. Nature. 2014 Apr 3;508(7494):S20. doi: 10.1038/508S20a.
- Purcell SM et al. A polygenic burden of rare disruptive mutations in schizophrenia. 2014. Nature. 2014 Jan 22. doi: 10.1038/nature12975.
- Fromer M et al. De novo mutations in schizophrenia implicate synaptic networks. 2014. Nature. 2014 Jan 22. doi: 10.1038/nature12929.
