= Ricardo Dolmetsch =

Colombian-American neuroscientist and entrepreneur

- Born: March 7, 1969 (age 57); Cali, Colombia
- Education: Brown University
- Known for: Regulation of gene transcription by calcium signaling, lymphocyte activation, models of human disease using induced pluripotent stem cells, gene therapy
- Scientific career
- Fields: Neurobiology, calcium cell signaling
- Workplaces: Tempero Bio, Stanford University
- Academic advisors: Michael Greenberg

Richard Carl Elciario Dolmetsch (or Ricardo Dolmetsch; born March 7, 1969) is a Colombian-American neuroscientist, educator and biotechnology entrepreneur. Dolmetsch is the president of Tempero Bio, a biotech company seeking to cure substance use disorders, and an adjunct professor at Stanford University.

== Biography and education ==
Dolmetsch was born and raised in Cali, Colombia and attended Colegio Bolivar. He was a member of the Colombian National Track team, winning the Colombian National Championships and representing his country in both the Pan American and Junior World Championships. Dolmetsch migrated to the United States to earn a B.S. from Brown University. He obtained a doctorate in neuroscience from Stanford University in 1997 under the supervision of Richard Lewis, where he worked on the role of calcium oscillations in lymphocyte activation. He completed a postdoctoral fellowship with Michael E. Greenberg at Harvard Medical School where he studied excitation-transcription coupling, specifically the role of voltage-gated calcium channels in controlling the activation of transcription factors in neurons.

== Career ==
Dolmetsch led a laboratory at Stanford University from 2002 to 2013 that studied the influence of electrical activity and calcium signals on early brain development.For two years he was also a senior director at the Allen Institute for Brain Science. His laboratory focused on the signaling pathways that connect L-type calcium channels to gene activation, and identified the link between voltage gated calcium channels and store-operated calcium channels. They developed tools including light-activated signaling proteins to control biochemical cascades, and induced pluripotent stem cell (iPSC)-based models of cardiac and neuronal cells. His lab used iPSCs to model neurodevelopmental and neuropsychiatric diseases, both at Stanford and at the Allen Institute for Brain Science. His papers on Timothy Syndrome and Phelan McDermid Syndrome identified neuronal defects in induced pluripotent stem cells from patients, setting the stage for the use of these models for drug development.

In 2013, Dolmetsch became global head of neuroscience at the Novartis Institutes of BioMedical Research (NIBR), where he founded a research and early development team. He curated a drug development pipeline that included treatments for rare orphan disorders, neurodegenerative diseases, calcium channelopathies and neuropsychiatric disorders such as autism, schizophrenia and addiction. His group used human stem cell-derived cellular models and genome-scale CRISPR screens in neuroscience drug development. His team at NIBR helped bring several therapies to the clinic, including erenumab (Aimovig) for migraine and siponimod (Mayzent) for multiple sclerosis.

In 2020, Dolmetsch moved to head research and development at uniQure, a company developing gene therapies for the liver and the central nervous system. Under his leadership uniQure built a gene therapy pipeline that included AMT-130, an experimental gene therapy for Huntington's disease, AMT-260, an experimental gene therapy for temporal lobe epilepsy, and AMT-191, an experimental treatment for Fabry disease. He also led uniQure's successful clinical testing and registration of Hemgenix, a treatment for hemophilia that received FDA approval in 2022.

== Impact and awards ==
Dolmetsch's graduate and postdoctoral work established a role for intracellular calcium oscillation frequency and amplitude in regulating transcription in eukaryotic cells. He is known for his research on calcium signaling in neurons and lymphocytes, and for his work in neuropsychiatric disease. He was an early developer of human stem cell models for studying diseases of the brain and heart, both in his laboratory at Stanford University and at the Allen Institute for Brain Science.As the global head of neuroscience at Novartis Institutes for BioMedical Research, he helped create a drug pipeline for neuropsychiatric diseases, introduced human stem cell models as tools for drug discovery in neuroscience and contributed to the development of several treatments for brain disorders that are now in the clinic including Aimovig (erenumab) for migraine and Kesimpta (ofatumumab) for multiple sclerosis. Dolmetsch was also involved in the development of Hemgenix, the first gene therapy for hemophilia. Dolmetsch has published over 70 scientific papers and received awards for his research, including an Andrew Carnegie Prize in Mind and Brain Sciences (2014) and the 2007 Society for Neuroscience Young Investigator Award.
