= Zhigang He =

Chinese-American neuroscientist

- Born: c. 1965 (age c. 60)
- Education: University of Toronto (PhD)
- Known for: Axon regeneration, spinal cord injury research
- Awards: Ameritec Prize (2005); Reeve-Irvine Research Medal (2019); Greenberg END Blindness Initiative, Visionary Award (2020); National Academy of Medicine (2021)
- Scientific career
- Fields: Neuroscience, Neurology, Ophthalmology
- Workplaces: Harvard Medical School; Boston Children's Hospital

Zhigang He (born c. 1975) is a Chinese-American neuroscientist and a professor of neurology and ophthalmology at Harvard Medical School. He is known for his research on axon regeneration and the restoration of function following spinal cord injuries and visual pathway injuries. Additionally, his research aims to understand the organizing principles that govern the connections between the brain and spinal cord.

== Education ==
He received his PhD in Genetics from the University of Toronto in 1996. He then held postdoctoral positions at the University of California, San Francisco. In 2000, he joined the Kirby Center in Neuroscience at Boston Children’s Hospital. He is currently a professor of Neurology and Ophthalmology at Harvard Medical School.

== Research ==
His research focuses on regeneration in the central nervous system (CNS), particularly in the optic nerve and spinal cord, as well as the molecular pathways involved in neural repair.

He discovered that the PTEN/mTOR and SOCS3/STAT3 signaling pathways are key regulators of the intrinsic growth capabilities of adult neurons. This work led to the development of the first set of manipulations that enable robust axon regrowth in multiple CNS injury models.

He investigated the fact that, in many spinal cord injury patients, not all axons are severed; however, the remaining connections often become functionally silent. He found that this functional dormancy is due to injury-induced dysfunctions of the chloride transporter KCC2 in spinal inhibitory neurons. Restoring KCC2 activity presents a highly translatable method for reviving the functionality of spared neuronal circuitry in patients with incomplete spinal cord injuries.

He optimized methods for systematically labeling spinal-projecting neurons (SPNs) and identified key functional organizations within brain-spinal cord connections. For example, he distinguished specific SPN populations that separately control motor, sensory, or sympathetic functions, as well as those that simultaneously regulate both motor and sympathetic pathways.

== Honors and awards ==
He has received several awards for his contributions to neuroscience, including:

- Ameritec Prize (2005) for advances toward paralysis treatment
- Reeve-Irvine Research Medal (2019)
- Visionary Award (2020) from the Greenberg END Blindness initiative
- Elected to the National Academy of Medicine (2021)

== Selected publications ==
- Park, K. K., Liu, K., Hu, Y., Smith, P. D., Wang, C., Cai, B., Xu, B., Connolly, L., & He, Z. (2008). Promoting axon regeneration in the adult CNS by modulation of the PTEN/mTOR pathway. Science, 322(5903), 963–966.
- Smith PD, Sun F, Park KK, Cai B, Wang C, Kuwako K, Martinez-Carrasco I, Connolly L, He Z. (2009). SOCS3 deletion promotes optic nerve regeneration in vivo. Neuron, 64(5), 617–623.
- Liu, K., Lu, Y., Lee, J. K., Samara, R., Willenberg, R., Sears-Kraxberger, I., Steward, O., Zheng, B., & He, Z. (2010). PTEN deletion enhances the regenerative ability of adult corticospinal neurons. Nature Neuroscience, 13(9), 1075–1081.
- Sun F, Park KK, Belin S, Wang D, Lu T, Chen G, Zhang K, Yeung C, Feng G, Yankner BA, He Z. (2011). Sustained axon regeneration induced by co-deletion of PTEN and SOCS3. Nature, 480(7377), 372–375.
- Chen, B., Li, Y., Zhang, Z., Brommer, B., Williams, P.R., Liu, Y., Hegarty, S. V., Zhu, S., Zhu, J., Guo, H., Lu, Y., Gu, X., and He, Z. (2018). Reactivation of Dormant Relay Pathways in Injured Spinal Cord by KCC2 Manipulations. Cell, 174, 521–535. PMID: PMC6172006.
