= Azad Bonni =

Canadian/American neuroscientist

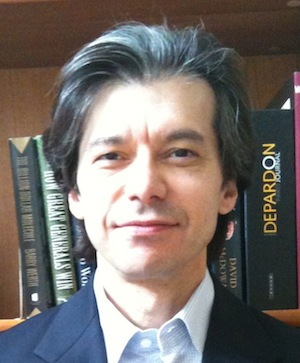
- Scientific career
- Fields: Neuroscience, cell biology and molecular biology
- Workplaces: Washington University in St. Louis; Harvard University

Azad Bonni is a Canadian and American neuroscientist of Kurdish origin. The focus of his research is to understand the mechanisms of neuronal connectivity in the brain. From October 2012 until June 30, 2019, he was the Edison Professor of Neuroscience and Chairman of the Department of Neuroscience at Washington University School of Medicine. As of July 1, 2019, he is SVP and head of neuroscience and rare diseases research and early development at Roche in Basel, Switzerland.

== Biography and research ==
Bonni grew up in Kurdistan. In 1976, he emigrated with his family to Canada. He completed secondary school at W. D. Lowe High School in Windsor, Ontario, in 1980. He enrolled at Queen's University in Kingston, Ontario, where he earned his medical degree in 1986. He specialized in neurology at McGill University and became chief neurology resident at the Montreal Neurological Institute in 1990. He earned his PhD in neuroscience at Harvard University in 1996. Bonni did his Ph.D. and postdoctoral studies in the laboratory of Michael Greenberg between 1992 and 1999, where he discovered signaling mechanisms by which neurotrophic factors, including ciliary neurotrophic factor (CNTF) and neurotrophins, induce transcription and cell differentiation and survival in the nervous system.

He launched his own laboratory in the Department of Pathology at Harvard Medical School in 1999. Bonni moved to the Department of Neurobiology at Harvard Medical School in 2011. His laboratory has made seminal contributions to the study of cell-intrinsic transcriptional and ubiquitin pathways that regulate neuronal connectivity in the developing brain. In 2012, Bonni was named the Edison Professor of Neuroscience and Chairman of the Department of Neuroscience at Washington University in St. Louis.

He was elected to the National Academy of Medicine in 2018.
