= MARCM =

A visual depiction of MARCM

Mosaic analysis with a repressible cell marker, or MARCM, is a genetics technique for creating individually labeled homozygous cells in an otherwise heterozygous Drosophila melanogaster. It has been a crucial tool in studying the development of the Drosophila nervous system. This technique relies on recombination during mitosis mediated by FLP-FRT recombination. As one copy of a gene, provided by the balancer chromosome, is often enough to rescue a mutant phenotype, MARCM clones can be used to study a mutant phenotype in an otherwise wildtype animal.

== Crosses ==
In order to label small populations of cells from a common progenitor, MARCM uses the GAL4-UAS system. A marker gene such as GFP is placed under control of a UAS promoter. GAL4 is ubiquitously expressed in these flies, thus driving marker expression. In addition, GAL80 is driven by a strong promoter such as tubP. Gal80 is an inhibitor of GAL4, and will suppress GFP expression under normal conditions. This tubP-GAL80 element is placed distal to an FRT site. A second FRT site is placed in trans to the GAL80 site, usually with a gene or mutation of interest distal to it. Finally, FLP recombinase is driven by an inducible promoter such as heat shock.

When FLP transcription is induced, it will recombine the chromosomes at the two FRT sites in cells undergoing mitosis. These cells will divide into two homozygous daughter cells—one carrying both GAL80 elements, and one carrying none. The daughter cell lacking GAL80 will be labeled due to expression of the marker via the GAL4-UAS system. All subsequent daughter cells from this progenitor will also express the marker.

Labs will often have MARCM-ready lines which have the inducible FLP, GAL80 distal to a FRT site, GAL4, and UAS-Marker. These can be readily crossed with flies that have a mutation of interest distal to a FRT site.

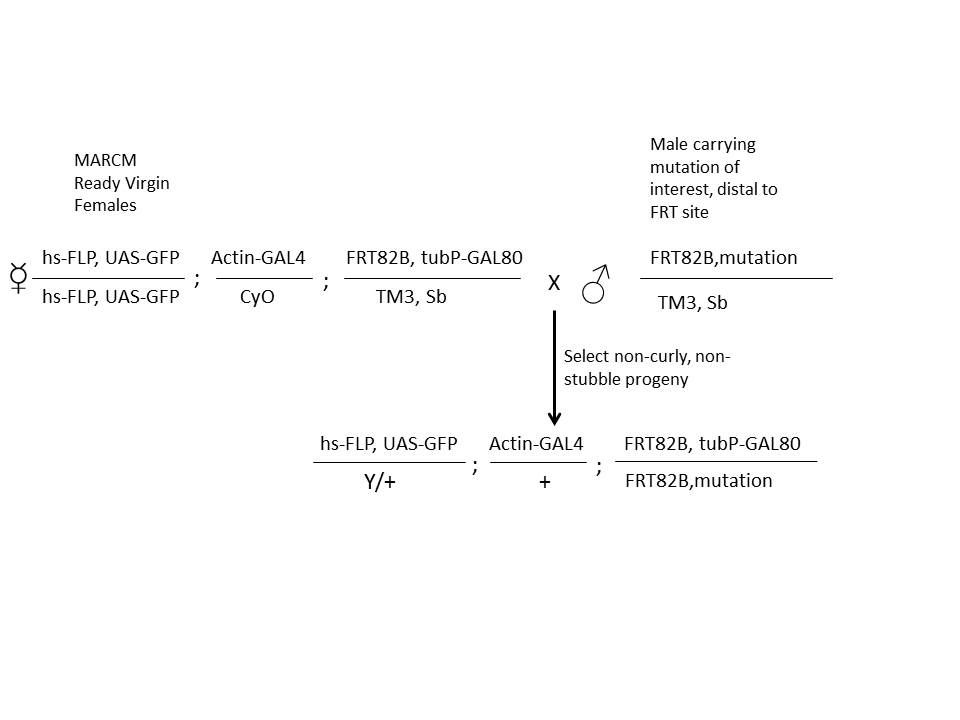
A Drosophila crossing scheme to produce progeny for MARCM studies

== Uses ==
By taking advantage of MARCM, one can easily trace all the cells that have been generated from a single progenitor. This is a useful tool in tracking development and specific cell lineages in various environmental conditions. Applications for MARCM include studying neuronal circuits, clonal analysis, genetic screens, spermatogenesis, growth cone development, neurogenesis, and tumor metastasis.

Many advances in the understanding of Drosophila development have been achieved through MARCM. The development, lineages, and characterizations of secondary axon tracts, anatomical maps of cholinergic neurons in the visual systems, lineages giving rise to a thoracic hemineuromere scaffold and the developmental framework for CNS architecture, the role of Delta in developmental programming in the ventral nerve cord, the wake-promoting octopaminergic cells in the medial protocerebrum, genes involved in neuronal morphogenesis of the mushroom bodies, and the regulation of commissural axon guidance have all been identified through MARCM techniques.

== Variations ==
There are many variations of MARCM. Twin-spot MARCM allows for the labeling of sister clones with two separate markers, thus allowing for a higher resolution of lineage tracing. In reverse MARCM, the mutation of interest is placed on the same chromosome as GAL80, so that the wild-type homozygous clones will be labeled. Flip-Out MARCM highlights individual cells inside of mutant clones (ref "Drosophila Dscam is required for divergent segregation of sister branches and suppresses ectopic bifurcation of axons," Neuron, 2002). The Q system allows for GAL4 independent MARCM by using the QF/QS system. Q-MARCM can also be combined with conventional MARCM in coupled MARCM, allowing the two progeny of a single cell division to be differentially labeled and independently manipulated. Lethal MARCM allows for the generation of large marked homozygous populations by including a lethal mutation near the GAL80 site. Dual-expression control MARCM uses the LexA-VP16 transcriptional system in concordance with GAL4-UAS. MARCM is also often used as a genetic screen.

== See also ==
- Mosaic (genetics)
