= Transheterozygote =

The term transheterozygote is used in modern genetics periodicals in two different ways. In the first, the transheterozygote has one mutant (-) and one wildtype allele (+) at each of two different genes (A-/A+ and B-/B+ where A and B are different genes). In the second, the transheterozygote carries two different mutated alleles of the same gene (A*/A', see example below). This second definition also applies to the term "heteroallelic combination".

Organisms with one mutant and one wildtype allele at one locus are called simply heterozygous, not transheterozygous.

Transheterozygotes are useful in the study of genetic interactions and complementation testing.

== Transheterozygous at two loci ==
A transheterozygote is a diploid organism that is heterozygous at two different loci (genes). Each of the two loci has one natural (or wild type) allele and one allele that differs from the natural allele because of a mutation. Such an organism can be created by crossing together two organisms that carry one mutation each, in two different genes, and selecting for the presence of both mutations simultaneously in an individual offspring. The offspring will have one mutant allele and one wildtype allele at each of the two genes being studied.

Transheterozygotes are useful in the study of genetic interactions. An example from Drosophila research: the wing vein phenotype of a recessive mutation in the Epidermal growth factor receptor (Egfr), a gene required for communication between cells, can be dominantly enhanced by a recessive mutation in Notch, another cell-signalling gene. A transheterozygote between Egfr and Notch has the genotype Notch/+ ; Egfr/+ (where Notch and Egfr represent mutant alleles, and + represents wildtype alleles). The dominant interaction between Egfr and Notch suggested that the Egfr and Notch signalling pathways act together within the cell to affect the pattern of veins in the fly's wings.

== Heteroallelic combination at one locus ==
Transheterozygote refers to a diploid organism for which both alleles are different mutated versions of the normal (or wild type) allele. The presence of two different mutant alleles at the same locus are often referred to as a heteroallelic combination.

A transheterozygous (heteroallelic) organism can be created by first crossing together two mutants, each with a different mutation affecting the same locus, and screening for the presence of both alleles simultaneously in an individual offspring. A recent research paper using this definition reported cases of transvection between different alleles of Hsp90.

This second definition is also sometimes applied to the situation where two different chromosomal deletions exist in trans (on the different homologous chromosomes) and fail to complement because they disrupt one or more common genes. (For example, Df(E1)/Df(GN50) in Stowers, et al. 2000).

By way of example, transheterozygote (heteroallelic combination) can result from a cross between two organisms with genotypes AA* and AA', where A is the wild type allele of a given gene, and A* and A' are two different mutant alleles of that gene. As can be seen in the following Punnett square, approximately one fourth of the offspring of this cross will inherit both the A* and A' mutant alleles, resulting in a transheterozygote genotype of A*A'.

	A	A*
A	A A	A A*
A'	A A'	A* A'

Transheterozygotes are useful in complementation testing, as pioneered by geneticist Edward B. Lewis. If a transheterozygote inheriting two unknown recessive mutations continues to show the mutant phenotype, it can be concluded that both mutations must be in the same gene, because inheritance of just one recessive mutation in each of two different genes would result in an organism displaying the dominant wild type phenotype.
