= Steven Hyman =

American neuroscientist

5th Provost of Harvard University
- In office December 10, 2001 – 2011
- Preceded by: Harvey V. Fineberg
- Succeeded by: Alan Garber

Personal details
- Education: Yale College (BA); University of Cambridge (MA); Harvard Medical School (MD)
- Scientific career
- Awards: Sarnat Prize (2016); Fellow of the American Association for the Advancement of Science (2011)
- Fields: Psychiatry
- Workplaces: Harvard University; National Institute of Mental Health; Broad Institute (2012-)

External videos
- 2016 Sarnat Prize Winner- Dr. Steven Hyman, March 14, 2017
- “What DSM-5, Updated Mental Health ‘Bible,’ Means for Diagnosing Patients”, Judy Woodruff, Michael First & Steven Hyman, PBS NewsHour, May 20, 2013.

Steven Edward Hyman is Director of the Stanley Center for Psychiatric Research at the Broad Institute of MIT and Harvard in Cambridge, Massachusetts. He is also Harvard University Distinguished Service Professor of Stem Cell and Regenerative Biology. Hyman was Provost of Harvard University from 2001 to 2011 and before that Director of the U.S. National Institute of Mental Health (NIMH) from 1996 to 2001. Hyman received the 2016 Rhoda and Bernard Sarnat International Prize in Mental Health from the National Academy of Medicine for "leadership in furthering understanding and treatment of psychiatric disorders as biological diseases".

== Early life and education ==
Hyman grew up in Teaneck, New Jersey, and graduated in 1970 from Teaneck High School. There he captained the wrestling team and was described by his fellow graduates as the "class intellect".

Hyman received his B.A. from Yale College; an M.A. from the University of Cambridge, which he attended as a Mellon fellow studying the history and philosophy of science; and his M.D. from Harvard Medical School. After an internship in medicine at Massachusetts General Hospital (MGH, 1980–1981), a residency in psychiatry at McLean Hospital (1981–1984), and a clinical and research fellowship in neurology at MGH (1983–1984), Hyman became a postdoctoral fellow at Harvard in molecular biology (1984–1989).

== Career ==
In 1989 Hyman was appointed an assistant professor of psychiatry at Harvard. In 1993 he became an associate professor. He was also director of research in the department of psychiatry at Massachusetts General Hospital from 1992 to 1996 and served as the inaugural faculty director of Harvard’s Interfaculty Initiative in Mind/Brain/Behavior from 1994 to 1996.

Hyman left Harvard to become the director of the National Institute of Mental Health (NIMH) from 1996 to 2001. Part of the National Institutes of Health (NIH), a group of agencies that fund and perform biomedical research, NIMH supports neuroscience and the knowledge needed to understand, diagnose, and treat brain disorders.

Hyman returned to Harvard as Provost from December 2001 to June 2011. As Provost, he was instrumental in the development of a number of interdisciplinary initiatives both within and between institutions. In 2009 he initiated an extensive process of reform of the Harvard libraries, and he paved the way for the creation of an open access mandate at Harvard. He was also involved in the development of Conflict of Interest guidelines to be applied across the entire institution.

Having stepped down as Provost, Hyman returned to research as the Harvard University Distinguished Service Professor of Stem Cell and Regenerative Biology in July 2011. As of February 15, 2012, he succeeded Edward Scolnick as director of the Broad Institute of MIT and Harvard’s Stanley Center for Psychiatric Research.

In 2000 Hyman became a member of the Institute of Medicine (IOM), which became the National Academy of Medicine as of 2015. He has served on its Board of Health Science Policy, spent two terms on its Governing Council (2012-2018), and represented the Governing Council as member to the Governing Board of the National Research Council (2016-2019). From 2012-2018 Hyman chaired the US National Academies' Forum on Neuroscience and Nervous System Disorders.

Hyman is a Fellow of the American College of Neuropsychopharmacology a Fellow of the American Academy of Arts and Sciences (2004), a Fellow of the American Association for the Advancement of Science (2011), and a Distinguished Life Fellow of the American Psychiatric Association.

From 2003–2017 Hyman was the editor of the Annual Review of Neuroscience. He serves on the Board of Directors of Annual Reviews. He is a founding member of the International Neuroethics Society, serving as its first President (2008–2014), Hyman also served as president of the Society for Neuroscience (2014–2015) and president of the American College of Neuropsychopharmacology (2018).

== Research ==
Hyman's research addresses the intersections between molecular biology, neuroscience, genetics, and psychiatry. Through his own research, as well as in his leadership positions at various institutions, he has emphasized the importance of fundamental research connecting genetics, the brain and behavior; of translating basic research into research and treatments for mental disorders; of carrying out extensive and carefully constructed clinical trials that engage with broad and diverse populations; and of studying disorders in childhood.

New information about the genetics, biology, and neuroscience underlying mental disorders is leading to a rethinking of the classification systems for mental disorders. There is increasing recognition that many mental disorders are quantitative deviations from health rather than categorically different from each other. Hyman works to reassess psychiatric classifications of mental disorders, and has helped to draft editions of the Diagnostic and Statistical Manual of Mental Disorders (DSM) and the International Classification of Diseases, Mental and Behavioral Disorders.

== Books ==
=== Author ===
- Arana, George W.; Hyman, Steven E. (1991). Handbook of psychiatric drug therapy (2nd ed.). Boston: Little, Brown. ISBN 0-316-04938-7.
- Hyman, Steven E.; Nestler, Eric J. (1993). The molecular foundations of psychiatry (1st ed.). Washington, D.C.: American Psychiatric Press. ISBN 0-88048-353-9.
- Hyman, Steven E.; Arana, George W.; Rosenbaum, Jerrold F. (1995). Handbook of psychiatric drug therapy (3rd ed.). Boston: Little, Brown, and Co. ISBN 0-316-04946-8.
- Nestler, Eric J.; Hyman, Steven E.; Malenka, Robert C. (2001). Molecular neuropharmacology : a foundation for clinical neuroscience. New York: McGraw-Hill, Medical Pub. Div. ISBN 978-0-07-112065-4.

=== Editor ===
- Hyman, Steven E., ed. (1984). Manual of psychiatric emergencies (1st ed.). Boston: Little, Brown. ISBN 0-316-38717-7.
- Hyman, Steven E.; Jenike, Michael A., eds. (1990). Manual of clinical problems in psychiatry : with annotated key references (1st ed.). Boston: Little, Brown. ISBN 0-316-38722-3.
- Hyman, Steven E., ed. (2002). The Science of Mental Health. New York: Routledge. ISBN 0-8153-3743-4. (multiple volumes)
- Nikolich, Karoly; Hyman, Steven E., eds. (2015). Translational neuroscience : toward new therapies. Cambridge, MA: The MIT Press. ISBN 978-0-262-02986-5.
