= Katja Brose =

American neuroscientist

Katja Brose is an American neuroscientist and a science program officer at the Chan Zuckerberg Initiative (CZI) where she leads CZI's efforts in neurodegenerative diseases.

== Education and career path ==
Brose received a bachelor's degree in Biology and European history from Brown University in 1990. As an undergraduate she also studied Evolutionary biology and Ecology. After her undergraduate work, she became a technician at an MIT molecular biology lab for about five years. She then was a doctoral student at the University of California, San Francisco (UCSF) from 1994 to 2000. Her research conducted in the laboratory of Marc Tessier Lavigne focused on axon guidance mechanisms in the developing spinal cord. She earned her PhD in Biochemistry in 2000. That year, she applied for employment at the scientific journal Neuron towards the end of her graduate studies at UCSF while doing lab work in neuroscience, and was subsequently hired. She was part of the editorial team at Cell Press for 17 years, where from 2004 to 2017 she was editor-in-chief of Neuron.

"For her graduate work, she worked in the laboratory of Dr. Marc Tessier-Lavigne focusing on axon guidance mechanisms in the developing spinal cord. In collaboration with Corey Goodman’s laboratory at UC-Berkeley, her research led to the identification of the receptor Robo and its ligand Slit as a new family of axon guidance molecules".
