= Lily Jan =

Taiwanese-American neuroscientist (born 1947)

Lily Yeh Jan
- 葉公杼
- Born: Yeh Kung-chu; January 20, 1947 (age 79); Fuzhou, China
- Education: National Taiwan University (BS); California Institute of Technology (PhD)
- Known for: Studies on the Shaker gene, potassium ion channels, peptide neurotransmitters, developmental neuroscience
- Spouse: Yuh Nung Jan
- Awards: Gruber Prize in Neuroscience (2012); Wiley Prize in Biomedical Sciences (2011); Gerard Prize in Neuroscience (2009); National Institute of Health MERIT Award (2006)
- Scientific career
- Fields: Neuroscience
- Workplaces: University of California, San Francisco
- Thesis: Investigations on Rhodopsin and Bacteriorhodopsin: I. Ultrastructural Localization of Rhodopsin in Vertebrate Retina. II. The Isomeric Configuration of the Bacteriorhodopsin Chromophore (1974)
- Doctoral advisor: Max Delbrück

Lily Yeh Jan (Chinese: 葉公杼; pinyin: Yè Gōngzhù; Wade–Giles: Yeh Kung-chu; born January 20, 1947) is a Taiwanese-American neuroscientist. She is the Jack and DeLoris Lange Professor of Physiology and Biophysics at the University of California, San Francisco, where she collaborates with her husband Yuh Nung Jan as co-principal investigators of the Jan Lab.

== Early life, education, and career ==
Lily Yeh was born Yeh Kung-chu (Ye Gongzhu) in Fuzhou, China, to two accountants, Yeh Hong-shu and Lee Chuan-hwa. In 1949, her family moved to Taiwan. She attended a public school, the Taipei First Girls' High School. As a high-school student she was particularly drawn to the field of physics and was inspired by the 1957 Nobel Prize in physics awarded to Tsung Dao Lee and Chen Ning Yang as well as the experimental physicist Chien Shiung Wu.

She attended National Taiwan University and earned her B.S. in physics in 1968. She then began her graduate studies with the intention of studying theoretical physics at Caltech. Two years later, in 1970, she was inspired by her thesis advisor, Max Delbrück (winner of the 1969 Nobel Prize), and Jerome Vinograd to change her field of study to biology.

Switching fields involved Jan sitting for a seven-day, open-book, open-library exam in the field of biology after having passed the qualifying exams for physics graduate students and also a placement test in organism biology. Her proposal and subsequent thesis work was focused on structural studies of rhodopsin localization in mammalian photoreceptors and also in plasma membranes. Her co-mentors for her graduate studies were Jean Paul Revel and Max Delbrück. Upon joining the Delbrück group, Jan was a member of the membrane biology subgroup where she performed challenging experiments in black lipid bilayers in the sub-terranean sub-basement of the electrical engineering building. The couple has shared that from this point forward Delbrück ensured separation of her graduate work from those of her spouse Yuh Nung Jan given his graduate studies with Delbrück were focused on the sensory responses of the fungus Phycomyces to light, among other stimuli.

She would go on to hold postdoctoral positions in the laboratory of Seymour Benzer at Caltech and subsequently in the laboratory of Stephen Kuffler at Harvard Medical School. Jan and her husband joined the faculty at University of California, San Francisco in 1979 where they are leaders of a joint research group. She has been a HHMI investigator since 1984.

== Research ==
After graduating from Caltech with her Ph.D. in 1974, Jan and her husband Yuh Nung Jan took summer courses at Cold Spring Harbor Laboratory together. This coursework would mark the beginning of their scientific collaboration which has spanned the majority of their careers. After that at Cold Spring Harbor Laboratory, Jan and her husband would both begin postdoctoral fellowships in the group of Seymour Benzer at Caltech. Their first collaborative effort was building an electrophysiology rig in the laboratory towards the purpose of characterizing the neuromuscular junction in Drosophila fly larvae. This effort would lead to their first two collaborative publications which were in print by 1976, only nine years after the Jans first met. During this time, the Jans would first observe that a male mutant ShakerKS133 larvae exhibited an exceptionally large excitatory response after motor stimulation. Unraveling whether the mutant phenotype was linked to the nerve or muscle of Shaker mutant larvae would demarcate the beginning of the Jans' investigations on ion channels.

Jan and her husband joined the faculty as assistant professors at UCSF in 1979 where they set up a joint lab. The two investigators only got $15,000 each in start-up money and 1,000 ft^{2} to share to set up their lab, however have shared they were drawn to UCSF by the people and the atmosphere.

The early years of the Jans' research group at UCSF was distinguished by their efforts on cloning the Shaker channel and studies of neural development. In the 1980s, their work on neural development was performed in collaboration with Alain Ghysen and Christine Dambly-Chaudiere. The Jans were tenured in 1983 and were selected as Howard Hughes Medical Institute Investigators in 1984. They have shared that from 1983 to 1986 their research goals were challenged by difficulties cloning the Shaker gene. In 1987, they were successful with cloning Shaker and enabling their team to perform functional studies on single potassium ion channels. Their neural development research has been particularly distinguished by breakthroughs in neurogenesis and cell fate specification (cut, numb, atonal, and daughterless).

Since 1994, the Jan lab has been organized in function and development subgroups led by each co-PI. The function group of the laboratory is led by Lily and largely focuses on the studies of ion channels, their assembly, and their dynamic response to neural activity. The development subgroup led by Yuh Nung has been engaged with questions surrounding dendrite morphogenesis.

== Awards ==
- Vilcek Prize in Biomedical Science (2017)
- Gruber Prize in Neuroscience (2012)
- Wiley Prize in Biomedical Sciences (2011)
- Albert and Ellen Grass Lecture, Society for Neuroscience (2010)
- Edward M. Scolnick Prize in Neuroscience, Massachusetts Institute of Technology (2010)
- Ralph W. Gerard Prize in Neuroscience, Society for Neuroscience (2009)
- Elected member, American Academy of Arts and Sciences (2007)
- Society of Chinese Bioscientists in America Presidential Award (2006)
- National Institute of Health MERIT Award (2006)
- Distinguished Alumni Award, California Institute of Technology (2006)
- K. S. Cole Award, Biophysical Society (2004)
- Stephen W. Kuffler Lecture, Harvard Medical School (1999)
- Harvey Lecture, New York (1998)
- Elected member, Academia Sinica, Taiwan (1998)
- Elected member, National Academy of Sciences (1995)
- 38th Faculty Lecturer Award, University of California, San Francisco (1995)
- W. Alden Spencer Award and Lectureship, Columbia University (1988)
- Klingstein Fellowship Award (1983-1983)
- Alfred P. Sloan Research Fellowship (1977-1979)

== Personal and family life ==
In 1967, she Jan traveled to Shitou, Taiwan for a hiking trip to celebrate her college graduation. This trip resulted in her meeting Yuh-Nung Jan and the beginning of their relationship. In 1971, they married with a simple ceremony in a Los Angeles courthouse followed by a celebration camping and hiking in Yosemite.

They had their first child together a daughter, Emily Huan-Ching Jan, on August 6, 1977. On November 7, 1984, their son Max Huang-Wen Jan was born and was named after Max Delbrück.

== Selected publications ==
- Jan LY, Revel JP (August 1974). "Ultrastructural localization of rhodopsin in the vertebrate retina". The Journal of Cell Biology. 62 (2): 257–73. doi:10.1083/jcb.62.2.257. PMC 2109407. PMID 4139160.
- Jan LY, Jan YN (October 1976). "L-glutamate as an excitatory transmitter at the Drosophila larval neuromuscular junction". The Journal of Physiology. 262 (1): 215–36. doi:10.1113/jphysiol.1976.sp011593. PMC 1307638. PMID 186587.
- Jan LY, Jan YN (October 1976). "Properties of the larval neuromuscular junction in Drosophila melanogaster". The Journal of Physiology. 262 (1): 189–214. doi:10.1113/jphysiol.1976.sp011592. PMC 1307637. PMID 11339.
