= Edward Scolnick =

- Education: Harvard University (BA, MD)
- Known for: Discovery of RAS pathway
- Scientific career
- Workplaces: Broad Institute; Merck Research Laboratories; Public Health Service; National Cancer Institute

Edward Scolnick is a core investigator at the Broad Institute, the former founding director of the Stanley Center for Psychiatric Research, and former head of research and development at Merck Research Laboratories.

== Education and career ==
Scolnick earned a B.A. in 1961 from Harvard University and a M.D. in 1965 from Harvard Medical School. After medical school, he joined the Public Health Service to avoid being drafted into the Vietnam War.

During his 15 years at the NIH's National Cancer Institute, Scolnick discovered the RAS oncogene that is involved in the critical signaling pathway that shifts an otherwise normal cell into the aggressive cells known as tumor cells. His work helped establish the concept of blocking signaling pathways as fundamental to cancer biology and drug discovery.

Scolnick joined Merck in 1982 as executive director of virus and cell biology, after being recruited from the National Institutes of Health. He was head of Research at Merck Research Laboratories from 1985 until he stepped down in 2002. While at Merck, he was involved in the development and introduction of 29 new medications and vaccines.

He was a key figure in the development and marketing of Vioxx, which was pulled from the market after it was discovered that the drug caused a dangerously high risk of myocardial infarction. Legal claims resulting from this have cost Merck billions. During the five years it was available in the US, more than 38,000 deaths were related to Vioxx use, and up to 25 million Americans took the drug. In the subsequent investigations, it was revealed that it was likely that Merck knew about the adverse effects of the drug, and Scolnick had dismissed them in order to push the drug to market before Bayer's Celebrex.

Scolnick began as the founding director of the Stanley Center for Psychiatric Research at Broad Institute in 2007. In 2012, he stepped down as director and became the Stanley Center's chief scientist, being succeeded by Steven Hyman.

In 1980 he received the Eli Lilly and Company-Elanco Research Award from the American Society for Microbiology. He is an elected member of the National Academy of Sciences and its Institute of Medicine, and the American Academy of Arts and Sciences. He was also appointed to the Board of Visitors at the University of Pittsburgh School of Medicine.

MIT awards the Edward M. Scolnick Prize in Neuroscience in his honor.
