= Yuh Nung Jan =

Chinese-American neuroscientist (born 1947)

- 詹裕農
- Born: January 11, 1947 (age 79); Shanghai, China
- Education: National Taiwan University (BS); California Institute of Technology (PhD)
- Known for: Developmental neuroscience
- Spouse: Lily Jan
- Awards: Gruber Foundation Neuroscience Prize; Elected member of the National Academy of Sciences; Elected member of the American Academy of Arts and Sciences; Elected member of the Academia Sinica; Distinguished Alumni Award Caltech; Javits Investigator Award from the NIH
- Scientific career
- Fields: Neuroscience
- Workplaces: University of California, San Francisco
- Thesis: Chitin Synthetase and Sensory Transduction in Phycomyces. II. The Avoidance Response, the House Growth Response and the Rheotropic Response of Phycomyces (1975)
- Doctoral advisor: Max Delbrück

Yuh Nung Jan (Chinese: 詹裕農; pinyin: Zhān Yùnóng; born January 11, 1947) is a Taiwanese-American neuroscientist. He is the Jack and DeLoris Lange Professor of Molecular Physiology at the University of California, San Francisco, where he works together with his wife Lily Jan as co-PIs of the Jan Lab.

== Biography ==
Jan was born in Shanghai, China, to Ten Sun Jen and Li Ju Chen from Jiangxi. His birthday is officially listed as December 20, 1946, but that is according to the Chinese calendar and corresponds to January 11, 1947, of the Western calendar. In 1949, his family escaped to Xinpu, Hsinchu, Taiwan. Jan attended a prestigious public school and excelled in a nationwide college entrance exam, placing in the top 10 out of 30,000 students.

Jan would go on to attend National Taiwan University (NTU) for his undergraduate studies where he earned his B.S. in physics in 1968. Jan fulfilled his military service as a communication and electronics officer in the Taiwanese Air Force. Lily Jan was a fellow student studying physics at National Taiwan University and would become his future wife. At the time, both of the Jans were interested in pursuing advanced studies in theoretical high-energy physics and applied to graduate school abroad. They were both accepted to the physics program at Caltech. They were the only two students to be accepted from NTU, a major academic achievement given how few foreign students were accepted to the program at the time and especially so from their university.

In line with his research interests as an undergraduate, Jan began his graduate studies at Caltech with the intention to study theoretical physics. However, research seminars at Caltech and a conversation with Max Delbrück, a winner of the 1969 Nobel Prize, inspired Yuh Nung to switch fields to biology. Max Delbrück would become his Ph.D. advisor which was particularly formative given that Delbrück was also a physicist who later switched fields to biological physics. Jan's Ph.D. studies were focused on studying the perception of sensory signals by a single-celled fungus.

As he approached graduation, Yuh Nung would come across a publication by the scientist Seymour Benzer detailing opportunities associated with correlating fly embryo morphology with functional behavior. Inspired by opportunities associated with such lines of research, Yuh Nung decided to pursue post-doctoral studies in the field. In preparation for this shift in research, he and Lily Jan spent a summer at Cold Spring Harbor learning techniques in experimental neuroscience. This would mark the start of their life-long collaboration in the experimental laboratory and later in their roles as independent investigators. Upon joining the Benzer laboratory as post-docs later that year, they would build their first experimental set-up together, an electrophysiology rig. Their early collaborative research in the Benzer group was focused on uncovering the basis for defects in synaptic transmission. A series of mutant flies, named Shaker, with uncontrolled muscle contractions proved crucial to these endeavors and set the stage for some of their most significant contributions in the field of neuroscience.

The Jans would later move to Harvard Medical School for a second postdoc with Steven Kuffler. Jan and his wife then joined the faculty at UCSF in 1979 where they are co-PIs of the Jan Lab and have won numerous awards together. Jan has been an Howard Hughes Medical Institute investigator since 1984.

== Awards ==
- Vilcek Prize in Biomedical Science (2017)
- Gruber Prize in Neuroscience (2012)
- Wiley Prize in Biomedical Sciences
- Edward M. Scolnick Prize in Neuroscience, McGovern Institute for Brain Research at MIT
- Ralph W. Gerard Prize, Society for Neuroscience
- Distinguished Alumni Award, California Institute of Technology
- Faculty Research Award, UCSF
- Outstanding Faculty Mentorship Award, Postdoctoral Scholars Association of UCSF
- W. Alden Spencer Award, Columbia University
- Jacob Javits Neuroscience Investigator Award, National Institute of Neurological Disorders and Stroke
- K.S. Cole Award, Biophysical Society
- SCBA Presidential Award, Society of Chinese Bioscientists in America

== Personal and family life ==
In 1967, Lily Jan traveled to Shitou, Taiwan for a hiking trip to celebrate her college graduation; this trip resulted in her meeting Yuh-Nung and the beginning of their relationship. In 1971, Lily and Yuh-Nung married with a simple ceremony in a Los Angeles courthouse followed by a celebration camping and hiking in Yosemite.

The Jans had their first child together a daughter, Emily Huan-Ching Jan, on August 6, 1977. Remarkably, Lily Jan was still involved in research leading up to her due date and went into early stages of labor in the midst of Seymour Benzer's group meeting. Just seven weeks later after celebrating the arrival of Emily, the Jans would move across the country to begin the next stages of their research careers at Harvard Medical School.

Just a few years later, the Jans had established their independent research group at UCSF. In 1984, they were named Howard Hughes Medical Institute investigators. That same year on November 7, 1984 the Jans welcomed their second child a son named Max Huang-Wen Jan after the Jans’ Ph.D. adviser, Max Delbruck.

The Jans have shared that before their children went to college they rarely attended scientific meetings together and that one parent was always home with their children. Outside of the lab, they have pursued their shared interest in exploration and hiking throughout their careers.
