= Neuron (journal) =

- Discipline: Neuroscience
- Language: English
- Edited by: Mariela Zirlinger

Publication details
- History: 1988–present (38 years)
- Publisher: Cell Press
- Frequency: Biweekly
- Open access: Partial
- Impact factor: 15 (2024)

Standard abbreviations
- ISO 4: Neuron

Indexing
- CODEN: NERNET
- ISSN: 0896-6273 (print); 1097-4199 (web)
- LCCN: 88648622
- OCLC no.: 17223779

Links
- Journal homepage; Online access

Neuron is a biweekly peer-reviewed scientific journal published by Cell Press, an imprint of Elsevier. Established in 1988, it covers neuroscience and related biological processes.

The current editor-in-chief is Mariela Zirlinger. The founding editors were Lily Jan, A. James Hudspeth, Louis Reichardt, Roger Nicoll, and Zach Hall. A past editor-in-chief was Katja Brose.
