= Member of the National Academy of Sciences =

Scientific honor conferred by the U.S. National Academy of Sciences

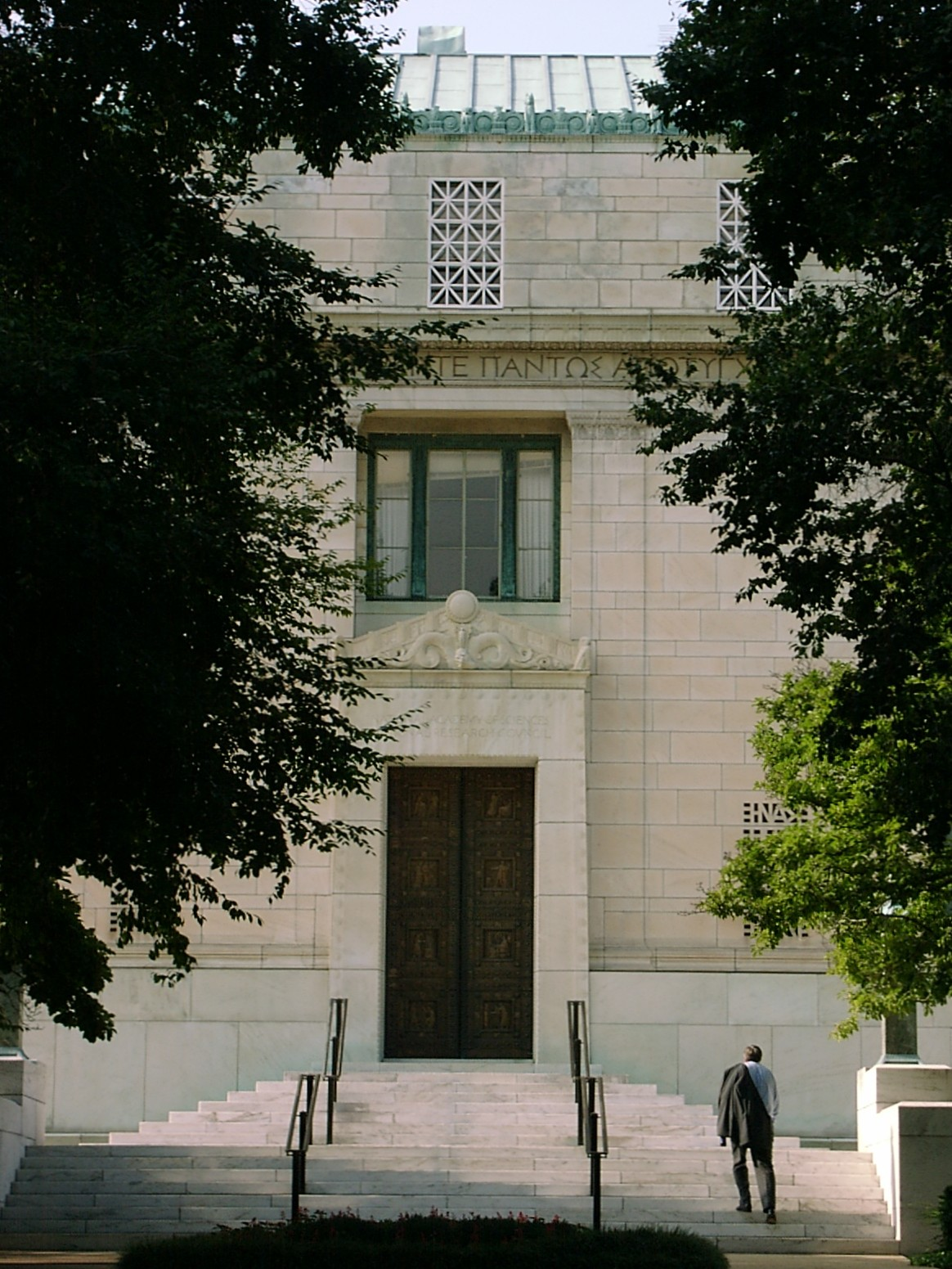
- The National Academy of Sciences Building in Washington, D.C.
- Awarded for: distinguished and continuing achievements in original research
- Sponsored by: National Academy of Sciences
- Date: Annually since 1863
- Location: Washington, D.C.
- Country: United States
- Total no. of members: 2,382 members 484 international members
- Website: nasonline.org/member-directory

Membership of the National Academy of Sciences is an award granted to scientists that the National Academy of Sciences (NAS) of the United States judges to have made “distinguished and continuing achievements in original research”. Membership is a mark of excellence in science and one of the highest honors that a scientist can receive.

== NAS members and international members ==
Three types of NAS membership exist:

1. Voting members, who must hold citizenship of the United States
2. Nonvoting international members, who have citizenship outside the United States
3. Emeritus members, who are no longer active and have rescinded their voting rights

As of May 2018 there were 2,382 active members and 484 international members, of whom approximately 190 have received Nobel Prizes. A full list of members can be found in the online members directory. See the list of members of the National Academy of Sciences and Category:Members of the United States National Academy of Sciences for examples.

=== Notable member firsts ===
Some notable member firsts and records include:

- Edward C. Pickering (1846–1919) was the youngest scientist elected, only 26 years old at the time of his election in 1873
- Florence R. Sabin (1871–1953) was the first woman to be elected a member in 1924
- David Blackwell (1919–2010) was the first African American elected in 1965
- Marcia McNutt was the first woman to serve as president of the NAS, following her election as a member in 2005
- Ben Barres (1954–2017) was the first transgender scientist elected in 2013
- Frances Arnold was the first woman to be elected to all three National Academies in the United States – the National Academy of Engineering (NAE, 2000), the National Academy of Medicine (NAM, 2004) and the National Academy of Sciences (NAS, 2008)
- Richard Feynman resigned his NAS membership because of what he perceived as the Academy's elitism and in-group favoritism. Feynman outlines the reasons for his resignation in his published correspondence Perfectly Reasonable Deviations from the Beaten Track Richard Lewontin also resigned for principled reasons (as opposed, say, to ill-health) in 1972, and Josiah Whitney was the first member to resign, in 1874.

=== Member diversity ===
Critics have pointed to a lack of member diversity because of a selection bias for “old white men” who dominate membership of the Academy. Elite institutions such as the from Ivy League, MIT, Stanford, the University of California and Caltech also dominate membership, thereby perpetuating the Matthew effect. Diversity of age, disability, race, religion, gender and sexual orientation is lower in NAS than in the general population. For example, women in science are an underrepresented group in the Academy but the proportion of female members is slowly growing.

- In 1989, the academy had just 57 female members and 1,516 male members (3% female in total)
- In 2010, there were 14 newly elected women (19% new female inductees) from 72 new members
- In 2011, there were only 9 women (12% new female inductees) from 72 newly elected members.
- In 2012, the Academy elected 84 new members, with a record high of 26 women (30% new female inductees)
- In 2019, 50 women out of 125 new members were female (40% of new female inductees), another record high although the proportion of women in the academy as a whole is much lower than 40%

Persons of color are also underrepresented.

== Nomination and election of new members ==
New members and international members have been elected annually since 1863. Membership can not be applied for as only voting academicians can submit formal nominations for newly elected members, for preferential voting in an annual ballot of members every March. Candidates for membership are considered by peer review and voted for again through several rounds of balloting and a final annual ballot in April at the annual general meeting (AGM) of the academy with results announced shortly after, usually early May. Each nomination includes a curriculum vitae (CV) with a 250 word summary of the nominee's scientific achievements, the basis for election and a list of no more than 12 of their most important papers published in scientific journals. The publication limit of 12 aims to focus assessment on the quality of a nominee's work, rather than the quantity of publications.

As of 2026, a maximum of 120 members may be elected annually. Non-citizens of the USA are elected as international members, with a maximum of 30 elected annually.

Newly elected members and international members are introduced at a presentation ceremony during the academy's annual meeting and sign the Registry of Membership.

=== Classes and sections ===
Both members and international members are affiliated with a section in one of six scientific classes.

National Academy of Sciences classes and sections
Class	Section	Section name
I – Physical and Mathematical Sciences	11	Mathematics
I – Physical and Mathematical Sciences	12	Astronomy
I – Physical and Mathematical Sciences	13	Physics
I – Physical and Mathematical Sciences	14	Chemistry
I – Physical and Mathematical Sciences	15	Geology
I – Physical and Mathematical Sciences	16	Geophysics
II – Biological Sciences	21	Biochemistry
II – Biological Sciences	22	Cellular and Developmental Biology
II – Biological Sciences	23	Physiology and Pharmacology
II – Biological Sciences	24	Cellular and Molecular Neuroscience
II – Biological Sciences	25	Plant Biology
II – Biological Sciences	26	Genetics
II – Biological Sciences	27	Evolutionary Biology
II – Biological Sciences	28	Systems Neuroscience
II – Biological Sciences	29	Biophysics and Computational Biology
III – Engineering and Applied Sciences	31	Engineering Sciences
III – Engineering and Applied Sciences	32	Applied Mathematical Sciences
III – Engineering and Applied Sciences	33	Applied Physical Sciences
III – Engineering and Applied Sciences	34	Computer and Information Sciences
IV – Biomedical Sciences	41	Medical Genetics, Hematology and Oncology
IV – Biomedical Sciences	42	Medical Physiology and Metabolism
IV – Biomedical Sciences	43	Immunology and Inflammation
IV – Biomedical Sciences	44	Microbial Biology
V – Behavioral and Social Sciences	51	Anthropology
V – Behavioral and Social Sciences	52	Psychological and Cognitive Sciences
V – Behavioral and Social Sciences	53	Social and Political Sciences
V – Behavioral and Social Sciences	54	Economic Sciences
VI – Applied Biological, Agricultural, and Environmental Sciences	61	Animal, Nutritional and Applied Microbial Sciences
VI – Applied Biological, Agricultural, and Environmental Sciences	62	Plant, Soil and Microbial Sciences
VI – Applied Biological, Agricultural, and Environmental Sciences	63	Environmental Sciences and Ecology
VI – Applied Biological, Agricultural, and Environmental Sciences	64	Human Environmental Sciences

== Member biographies ==
Since 1966, newly elected members of the National Academy of Sciences have been invited to contribute an inaugural year article (IYA) to Proceedings of the National Academy of Sciences of the United States of America (PNAS) which is accompanied by a brief biography of the author. Biographies of deceased members are published in the Biographical Memoirs of the National Academy of Sciences (BMNAS), for example see David Arnett's biography of Alastair G. W. Cameron.
