= List of members of the National Academy of Sciences (human environmental sciences) =

This list is a subsection of the List of members of the National Academy of Sciences, which includes more than 7,000 members and international members of the United States National Academy of Sciences, both living and deceased, each affiliated with one of 31 disciplinary sections. Members are listed under their primary section, and each person's name, primary institution, and election year are given. For deceased members, the year of death is noted.

== Human environmental sciences ==
Name	Institution	Year
Arun Agrawal	University of Notre Dame	2018
Gregory P. Asner	Arizona State University	2013
Christopher B. Barrett	Cornell University	2022
Scott Barrett	Columbia University	2024
Ian J. Bateman	University of Exeter	2021
Kamaljit S. Bawa	University of Massachusetts Boston	2022
Anthony J. Bebbington	Ford Foundation	2009
Rosina Bierbaum	University of Michigan	2019
John R. Borchert (died 2001)	University of Minnesota	1976
Eduardo S. Brondizio	Indiana University at Bloomington	2022
Marilyn A. Brown	Georgia Institute of Technology	2020
Karl W. Butzer (died 2016)	University of Texas at Austin	1996
Chien-Jen Chen	Academia Sinica	2017
Richard L. Church	University of California, Santa Barbara	2022
William A. V. Clark	University of California, Los Angeles	2005
William C. Clark	Harvard University	2002
Ellis B. Cowling (died 2021)	North Carolina State University	1973
Maureen L. Cropper	University of Maryland, College Park	2008
Susan Cutter	University of South Carolina	2024
Ruth DeFries	Columbia University	2006
Thomas Dietz	Michigan State University	2024
Jane Elith	University of Melbourne	2020
Jessica Fanzo	Johns Hopkins University	2024
Baruch Fischhoff	Carnegie Mellon University	2017
A. Stewart Fotheringham	Florida State University	2013
Janet Franklin	San Diego State University	2014
Peter H. Gleick	Pacific Institute	2006
Michael F. Goodchild	University of California, Santa Barbara	2002
Nancy Grimm	Arizona State University	2019
Peter Haggett	University of Bristol	2008
W. Michael Hanemann	Arizona State University	2011
Susan Hanson	Clark University	2000
Rashid Hassan (died 2023)	University of Pretoria	2019
Geoffrey M. Heal	Columbia University	2016
Mario Herrero	Cornell University	2024
John P. Holdren	Harvard University	1991
Calestous Juma (died 2017)	Harvard University	2005
Daniel M. Kammen	Johns Hopkins University	2025
Roger E. Kasperson (died 2021)	Clark University	2003
Robert W. Kates (died 2018)	Brown University	1975
Robin W. Kimmerer	State University of New York College of Environmental Science and Forestry	2023
Catherine L. Kling	Cornell University	2015
Eric F. Lambin	Université catholique de Louvain	2009
Maria Carmen Lemos	University of Michigan	2023
Jianguo Liu	Michigan State University	2025
Diana M. Liverman	University of Arizona	2020
Wolfgang Lutz	International Institute for Applied Systems Analysis	2016
Akinlawon Mabogunje (died 2022)	Development Policy Centre	1999
Glen M. MacDonald	University of California, Los Angeles	2015
Thomas F. Malone (died 2013)	North Carolina State University	1968
Michael E. Mann	University of Pennsylvania	2020
Bonnie J. McCay	Rutgers University	2012
Anthony J. McMichael (died 2014)	Australian National University	2011
Jerry M. Melillo	Marine Biological Laboratory	2014
Edward L. Miles (died 2016)	University of Washington	2003
Emilio F. Moran	Michigan State University	2010
Granger Morgan	Carnegie Mellon University	2007
Ellen S. Mosley-Thompson	Ohio State University	2009
William D. Nordhaus	Yale University	2001
Elinor Ostrom (died 2012)	Indiana University	2001
Zhiyun Ouyang	Chinese Academy of Sciences	2022
Claire L. Parkinson	NASA Goddard Space Flight Center	2016
Steward T.A. Pickett	Cary Institute of Ecosystem Studies	2021
Prabhu L. Pingali	Cornell University	2007
Stephen Polasky	University of Minnesota	2010
Marilyn Raphael	University of California, Los Angeles	2025
Robin S. Reid	Colorado State University	2021
Vernon W. Ruttan (died 2008)	University of Minnesota	2008
Pedro A. Sanchez (died 2026)	Columbia University	2012
Hans Joachim Schellnhuber	International Institute for Applied Systems Analysis	2005
Robert J. Scholes (died 2021)	University of the Witwatersrand	2014
Kathleen Segerson	University of Connecticut	2022
Karen C. Seto	Yale University	2017
J. Marshall Shepherd	University of Georgia	2021
Drew T. Shindell	Duke University	2023
Kirk R. Smith (died 2020)	University of California, Berkeley	1997
Linda T. Smith	Te Whare Wānanga o Awanuiārangi	2023
V. Kerry Smith	Arizona State University	2004
Waldo R. Tobler (died 2018)	University of California, Santa Barbara	1982
Compton J. Tucker III	NASA Goddard Space Flight Center	2025
B. L. Turner II	Arizona State University	1995
Arild Underdal (died 2025)	University of Oslo	2017
Gilbert F. White (died 2006)	University of Colorado Boulder	1973
M. Gordon Wolman (died 2010)	Johns Hopkins University	1988
Julian Wolpert	Princeton University	1977
Dawn Jeannine Wright	Environmental Systems Research Institute, Inc.	2021
Anastasios Xepapadeas	Athens University of Economics and Business	2018
David Zilberman	University of California, Berkeley	2019
