= Martin Saunders =

Martin Saunders may refer to:

- Martin Saunders, English musician, vocalist with The Twang
- Martin Saunders (chemist), American chemist, member of the United States National Academy of Sciences
- Martin Saunders, one of the dive tenders involved in the Byford Dolphin diving bell incident in 1983, and its only survivor

== See also ==
- Martin Lee Sanders (1952–2022), American serial killer and rapist
