= Josiah McElheny =

American sculptor (born 1966)

- Born: 1966; Boston, United States
- Education: Rhode Island School of Design
- Known for: Sculpture, Assemblage
- Awards: MacArthur Fellows Program

Josiah McElheny (1966, Boston) is an artist and sculptor, primarily known for his work with glass blowing and assemblages of glass and mirrored glassed objects (see glass art). He is a 2006 recipient of the MacArthur Fellows Program. He lives and works in New York City.

== Early life and education ==
McElheny grew up in Brookline, Massachusetts. McElheny went on to receive his BFA from the Rhode Island School of Design in 1988. As part of that program, he trained under master glassblower Ronald Wilkins. After graduating, he was an apprentice to master glassblowers Jan-Erik Ritzman, Sven-Ake Caarlson and Lino Tagliapietra.

== Career ==
In earlier works McElheny played with notions of history and fiction. Examples of this are works that recreate Renaissance glass objects pictured in Renaissance paintings and modern (but lost) glass objects from documentary photographs (such as works by Adolf Loos). He draws from a range of disciplines like architecture, physics, and literature, among others, and he works in a variety of media.

McElheny has mentioned the influence of the writings of Jorge Luis Borges in his work. His work has also been influenced by the work of the American abstract artist Donald Judd.

McElheny has also expressed interest in glassblowing as part of an oral tradition handed down generation to generation. He has used the infinity mirror visual effect in his explorations of apparently infinite space. His work also sometimes deals with issues of museological displays.

One of the artist's ongoing projects is "An End to Modernity" (2005), commissioned by the Wexner Center for the Arts at Ohio State University. The piece is a twelve-foot-wide by ten-foot-high chandelier of chrome and transparent glass modeled on the 1960s Lobmeyr design for the chandeliers found in Lincoln Center, and evoking as well the Big Bang theory. "The End of the Dark Ages," again inspired by the Metropolitan Opera House chandeliers and informed by logarithmic equations devised by the cosmologist David H. Weinberg was shown in New York City in 2008. Later that year, the series culminated in a massive installation titled "Island Universe" at White Cube in London and in Madrid. In 2019 the installation was exhibited at Stanford University's Cantor Center for the Arts.

== Exhibitions ==
=== Solo exhibitions ===
- 1990 – Jägarens Glasmuseet (The Hunter's Glass Museum), Arnescruv, Sweden,
- 1993 – originals, fakes, reproductions, William Traver Gallery, Seattle
- 1994 – Authentic History, Robert Lehman Gallery, Brooklyn, New York
- 1995 – Stephen Friedman Gallery, London
- 1995 – Installation with Ancient Roman Glass, Ancient Mediterranean and Egypt Gallery, Seattle Art Museum, Seattle,
- 1995 – Donald Young Gallery, Seattle
- 1996 – Barbara Kraków Gallery, Boston
- 1997 -Non-Decorative Beautiful Objects, AC Project Room, New York
- 1997 – Three Alter Egos, Donald Young Gallery, Seattle
- 1999 – The Henry Art Gallery, University of Washington, Seattle
- 1999 – The Isabella Stewart Gardner Museum, Boston
- 2000 – Christian Dior, Jorges Luis Borges, Adolf Loos, Donald Young Gallery, Chicago and Brent Sikkema, New York
- 2001 – Metal Party, Public Art Fund, New York
- 2001 – Metal Party, Yerba Buena Center for the Arts, San Francisco
- 2001 – Johnson County Community College, Overland Park, Kansas
- 2002 – Centro Galego de Arte Contemporánea, Santiago de Compostela, Spain
- 2003 – Theories About Reflection, Brent Sikkema Gallery, New York
- 2003 – Antipodes: Josiah McElheny, White Cube, London
- 2004 – Total Reflective Abstraction, Donald Young Gallery, Chicago
- 2005 – An End to Modernity, Wexner Center for the Arts at Ohio State University, Columbus, Ohio
- 2006 – Modernity 1929–1965, Andrea Rosen Gallery, New York
- 2006 – Cosmology, Design, and Landscape, Part I, Donald Young Gallery, Chicago
- 2007 – Cosmology, Design, and Landscape, Part II, Donald Young Gallery, Chicago
- 2007 – Projects 84: The Alpine Cathedral and the City-Crown, The Museum of Modern Art, New York
- 2007 – The 1st at Moderna: The Alpine Cathedral and the City-Crown, Moderna Museet, Stockholm
- 2008 – The Last Scattering Surface, Henry Art Gallery, University of Washington, Seattle and Rochester Art Center, Rochester, Minnesota
- 2008 – Das Lichtklub von Batavia/The Light Club of Batavia, Institut im Glaspavillon, Berlin
- 2008 – The Light Club of Batavia, Donald Young Gallery, Chicago
- 2008 – The End of the Dark Ages, Andrea Rosen Gallery, New York
- 2008 – Island Universe, White Cube, London
- 2009 – A Space for an Island Universe, Museo Nacional Centro de Arte Reina Sofia, Madrid
- 2009 – Proposal for a Chromatic Modernism, Andrea Rosen Gallery, New York
- 2012 – Some Pictures of the Infinite, Institute of Contemporary Art, Boston
- 2016 – The Ornament Museum, Museum of Applied Arts, Vienna
- 2017 – The Crystal Land, White Cube, London
- 2017 – Prismatic Park, Madison Square Park Conservancy, New York
- 2018 – Island Universe, Moody Center for the Arts, Houston
- 2018 – Cosmic Love, Corbett vs. Dempsey, Chicago
- 2019 – Island Universe, Cantor Arts Center, Stanford
- 2019 – Observations at Night, James Cohan Gallery, New York
- 2021 – Libraries, James Cohan Gallery, New York

== Awards ==
- 1993 – Betty Bowen Special Recognition Award, Seattle Art Museum, Seattle, Washington
- 1995 – Award Winner, 1995 Biennial Competition of The Louis Comfort Tiffany Foundation, New York, New York
- 1998 – Bagley Wright Fund Award, Seattle, Washington
- 2000 – The 15th Rakow Commission, Corning Museum of Glass, Corning, New York
- 2005 – Artist-in-Residence Award, Wexner Center for the Arts, Columbus, Ohio
- 2006 – MacArthur Fellows Program

== Permanent collections ==
- Albright-Knox Art Gallery, Buffalo
- Carnegie Museum of Art, Pittsburgh
- Center for Curatorial Studies, Bard College, Annandale-on-Hudson
- Centro Galego de Arte Contemporanea, Santiago di Compostela
- Chrysler Museum of Art, Norfolk
- Columbus Museum of Art, Columbus
- Corning Museum of Glass, Corning
- Dallas Museum of Art, Dallas
- Detroit Institute of Arts, Detroit
- Indianapolis Museum of Art, Indianapolis
- Institute of Contemporary Art, Boston
- Los Angeles County Museum of Art, Los Angeles
- Memorial Art Gallery, Rochester
- Milwaukee Art Museum, Milwaukee
- Moderna Museet, Stockholm
- Munson-Williams-Proctor Arts Institute, Utica
- Museo Nacional Centro de Arte Reina Sofía, Madrid
- Museum of Fine Arts, Boston
- Museum of Modern Art, New York
- Phoenix Art Museum, Phoenix
- Rhode Island School of Design Museum, Providence
- Santa Barbara Museum of Art, Santa Barbara
- Seattle Art Museum, Seattle
- Tate Modern, London
- Whitney Museum of American Art, New York

== Books ==
- Josiah McElheny: A Prism. Skira Rizzoli International, 2010. ISBN 978-0-8478-3415-0.
- The Light Club: On Paul Scheerbart's 'The Light Club of Batavia'. University of Chicago Press, 2010. ISBN 978-0-226-51457-4.
