= Biographical Memoirs of the National Academy of Sciences =

- Language: English

Publication details
- History: 1877 to present
- Publisher: National Academy of Sciences (United States)

Standard abbreviations
- ISO 4: Biogr. Mem. Natl. Acad. Sci.

Indexing
- ISSN: 0077-2933

Links
- Journal homepage

The Biographical Memoirs of the National Academy of Sciences has been published by the United States National Academy of Sciences since 1877 and presents biographies of selected members. This series of annual volumes, and the analogous British Biographical Memoirs of Fellows of the Royal Society, are "important examples of biographical serials".

The entries in the series are written by an academy member familiar with the subject's work and are written after the subject's death. Each entry includes a biography, a photo, and a copy of the subject's signature. Recent biographies from this series have also been made available online.
