= List of members of the National Academy of Sciences (evolutionary biology) =

This list is a subsection of the List of members of the National Academy of Sciences, which includes more than 7,000 members and international members of the United States National Academy of Sciences, both living and deceased, each affiliated with one of 31 disciplinary sections. Members are listed under their primary section, and each person's name, primary institution, and election year are given. For deceased members, the year of death is noted.

Name	Institution	Year
Anurag Agrawal	Cornell University	2021
Richard D. Alexander (died 2018)	University of Michigan	1974
R. W. Allard (died 2003)	University of California, Davis	1973
Wyatt W. Anderson (died 2023)	University of Georgia	1987
John C. Avise	University of California, Irvine	1991
Spencer C. H. Barrett	University of Toronto	2020
George A. Bartholomew (died 2006)	University of California, Los Angeles	1985
Nicholas Barton	Institute of Science and Technology Austria	2024
May R. Berenbaum	University of Illinois at Urbana–Champaign	1994
J. T. Bonner (died 2019)	Princeton University	1973
Adriana D. Briscoe	University of California, Irvine	2024
Roy J. Britten (died 2012)	California Institute of Technology	1972
James J. Bull	University of Idaho	2016
Sean B. Carroll	University of Maryland, College Park	2007
Hampton L. Carson (died 2004)	University of Hawaiʻi at Mānoa	1978
Brian Charlesworth	University of Edinburgh	2013
Deborah Charlesworth	University of Edinburgh	2022
Andrew G. Clark	Cornell University	2012
M. T. Clegg	University of California, Irvine	1990
Edwin H. Colbert (died 2001)	Museum of Northern Arizona	1957
Jacques-Yves Cousteau (died 1997)	Cousteau Society	1968
Peter R. Crane	Oak Spring Garden Foundation	2001
Edward S. Deevey Jr. (died 1988)	University of Florida	1981
Jody W. Deming	University of Washington	2003
Michael J. Donoghue	Yale University	2005
W. Ford Doolittle	Dalhousie University	2002
Scott V. Edwards	Harvard University	2015
Thomas Eisner (died 2011)	Cornell University	1969
Douglas J. Emlen	University of Montana	2023
Marcus W. Feldman	Stanford University	2013
Joseph Felsenstein	University of Washington	1999
Walter M. Fitch (died 2011)	University of California, Irvine	1989
Douglas J. Futuyma	Stony Brook University	2005
Raghavendra Gadagkar	Indian Institute of Science	2006
Madhav Gadgil (died 2026)	Indian Institute of Science	1991
Stephen Jay Gould (died 2002)	Harvard University	1989
B. Rosemary Grant	Princeton University	2008
Peter R. Grant	Princeton University	2007
John L. Harper (died 2009)	University of Wales, Aberystwyth	1984
Daniel L. Hartl	Harvard University	2005
Arthur Hasler (died 2001)	University of Wisconsin–Madison	1969
David M. Hillis	University of Texas at Austin	2008
Hopi E. Hoekstra	Harvard University	2016
Bert Hölldobler	Arizona State University	1998
Raymond B. Huey	University of Washington	2024
G. Evelyn Hutchinson (died 1991)	Yale University	1950
David Jablonski	University of Chicago	2010
Warwick E. Kerr (died 2018)	Federal University of Uberlândia	1990
Margaret G. Kidwell	University of Arizona	1996
Nicole King	University of California, Berkeley	2022
Mark Kirkpatrick	University of Texas at Austin	2020
Richard G. Klein	Stanford University	2003
Russell S. Lande	University of California, San Diego	2015
Richard E. Lenski	Michigan State University	2006
Bruce R. Levin	Emory University	2012
Wen-Hsiung Li	Academia Sinica	2003
Jonathan B. Losos	Washington University in St. Louis	2018
Michael Lynch	Arizona State University	2009
Trudy F. C. Mackay	Clemson University	2010
Susana Magallón	Universidad Nacional Autónoma de México	2023
Lynn Margulis (died 2011)	University of Massachusetts Amherst	1983
Ernst Mayr (died 2005)	Harvard University	1954
Charles D. Michener (died 2015)	University of Kansas	1965
John A. Moore (died 2002)	University of California, Riverside	1963
Nancy A. Moran	University of Texas at Austin	2004
Masatoshi Nei (died 2023)	Temple University	1997
Eviatar Nevo	University of Haifa	2000
Rasmus Nielsen	University of California, Berkeley	2022
H. Frederik Nijhout	Duke University	2025
Tomoko Ohta	National Institute of Genetics	2002
Everett C. Olson (died 1993)	University of California, Los Angeles	1980
Gordon H. Orians	University of Washington	1989
Sarah P. Otto	University of British Columbia	2013
Svante Pääbo	Max Planck Institute for Evolutionary Anthropology	2004
Catherine L. Peichel	University of Bern	2023
Naomi Pierce	Harvard University	2023
David Pilbeam	Harvard University	1992
Colin S. Pittendrigh (died 1996)	Stanford University	1963
Jonathan K. Pritchard	Stanford University	2025
Molly Przeworski	Columbia University	2020
David Queller	Washington University in St. Louis	2024
S. Dillon Ripley (died 2001)	Smithsonian Institution	1968
Gene E. Robinson	University of Illinois at Urbana–Champaign	2005
José Sarukhán	Universidad Nacional Autónoma de México	1993
Barbara A. Schaal	Washington University in St. Louis	1999
Douglas W. Schemske	Michigan State University	2017
Dolph Schluter	University of British Columbia	2017
Johanna Schmitt	University of California, Davis	2008
J. William Schopf	University of California, Los Angeles	1998
Robert K. Selander (died 2015)	Pennsylvania State University	1982
Beth A. Shapiro	University of California, Santa Cruz	2025
Ruth G. Shaw	University of Minnesota	2021
Neil H. Shubin	University of Chicago	2011
Charles G. Sibley (died 1998)	Yale University	1986
Montgomery W. Slatkin	University of California, Berkeley	2014
Robert R. Sokal (died 2012)	State University of New York at Stony Brook	1987
G. Ledyard Stebbins (died 2000)	University of California, Davis	1952
Nils Christian Stenseth	University of Oslo	2015
Joan E. Strassmann	Washington University in St. Louis	2013
Sharon Y. Strauss	University of California, Davis	2022
Michael Turelli	University of California, Davis	2021
Paul E. Turner	Yale University	2019
James W. Valentine (died 2023)	University of California, Berkeley	1984
Geerat J. Vermeij	University of California, Davis	2022
Günter P. Wagner	Yale University	2018
Warren H. Wagner Jr. (died 2000)	University of Michigan	1985
David B. Wake (died 2021)	University of California, Berkeley	1998
Bruce Wallace (died 2015)	Virginia Polytechnic Institute and State University	1970
Mary Jane West-Eberhard	Smithsonian Tropical Research Institute	1988
George C. Williams (died 2010)	Stony Brook University	1993
Edward O. Wilson (died 2021)	Harvard University	1969
Anne D. Yoder	Duke University	2023
Zhonghe Zhou	Chinese Academy of Sciences	2010
Marlene Zuk	University of Minnesota	2019
