= List of members of the National Academy of Sciences (economic sciences) =

This list is a subsection of the List of members of the National Academy of Sciences, which includes members and international members of the United States National Academy of Sciences, living and deceased, each affiliated with one of the academy's disciplinary sections. Members are listed under their primary section, and each entry gives the person's name, primary institution, and election year. For deceased members, the year of death is noted.

== Economic sciences ==
Name	Institution	Year
Katharine G. Abraham	University of Maryland, College Park	2022
Daron Acemoglu	Massachusetts Institute of Technology	2014
George A. Akerlof	University of California, Berkeley	2003
Joshua D. Angrist	Massachusetts Institute of Technology	2023
Maurice Allais (died 2010)	Ecole Nationale Superieure des Mines de Paris	1990
Aloisio Araujo	Institute of Pure and Applied Mathematics	2006
Kenneth J. Arrow (died 2017)	Stanford University	1968
Orley C. Ashenfelter	Princeton University	2018
Susan Athey	Stanford University	2012
Robert J. Aumann	The Hebrew University of Jerusalem	1985
Abhijit Banerjee	Massachusetts Institute of Technology	2020
William J. Baumol (died 2017)	New York University	1987
Gary S. Becker (died 2014)	University of Chicago	1975
Abram Bergson (died 2003)	Harvard University	1980
Ben S. Bernanke	The Brookings Institution	2021
Brian J. L. Berry (died 2025)	University of Texas at Dallas	1975
Steven T. Berry	Yale University	2025
Marianne Bertrand	The University of Chicago	2021
Jagdish N. Bhagwati	Columbia University	2012
Richard Blundell	University College London	2019
Ester Boserup (died 1999)	No Affiliation	1989
William A. Brock	University of Wisconsin-Madison	1998
David Card	University of California, Berkeley	2021
Anne Case	Princeton University	2020
Gary E. Chamberlain (died 2020)	Harvard University	2011
Raj Chetty	Harvard University	2018
John S. Chipman (died 2022)	University of Minnesota, Minneapolis	1993
C. Y. Cyrus Chu	Academia Sinica (Taiwan)	2017
Janet Currie	Yale University	2019
Partha Sarathi Dasgupta	University of Cambridge	2001
Angus S. Deaton	Princeton University	2015
Gérard Debreu (died 2004)	University of Paris	1977
Edward F. Denison (died 1992)	The Brookings Institution	1985
Douglas W. Diamond	The University of Chicago Booth School of Business	2017
Peter A. Diamond	Massachusetts Institute of Technology	1984
Avinash K. Dixit	Princeton University	2005
Jacques Drèze (died 2022)	Université catholique de Louvain	1993
Esther Duflo	Massachusetts Institute of Technology	2017
Robert F. Engle	New York University	2005
Amy N. Finkelstein	Massachusetts Institute of Technology	2018
Robert W. Fogel (died 2013)	University of Chicago	1973
Milton Friedman (died 2006)	Stanford University	1973
Drew Fudenberg	Massachusetts Institute of Technology	2014
Matthew A. Gentzkow	Stanford University	2022
Allan Gibbard	University of Michigan	2009
Edward L. Glaeser	Harvard University	2024
Pinelopi Koujianou Goldberg	Yale University	2019
Arthur S. Goldberger (died 2009)	University of Wisconsin-Madison	1986
Claudia D. Goldin	Harvard University	2006
Michael Greenstone	The University of Chicago	2024
Zvi Griliches (died 1999)	Harvard University	1975
Frank H. Hahn (died 2013)	University of Cambridge	1988
Robert Ernest Hall	Stanford University	2004
Lars Peter Hansen	The University of Chicago	1999
Arnold C. Harberger	University of California, Los Angeles	1989
John C. Harsanyi (died 2000)	University of California, Berkeley	1992
Oliver Hart	Harvard University	2016
Sergiu Hart	The Hebrew University of Jerusalem	2025
James J. Heckman	The University of Chicago	1992
John R. Hicks (died 1989)	University of Oxford	1979
Hendrik S. Houthakker (died 2008)	Harvard University	1974
Hilary W. Hoynes	University of California, Berkeley	2023
Leonid Hurwicz (died 2008)	University of Minnesota	1974
Guido W. Imbens	Stanford University	2022
Walter Isard (died 2010)	Cornell University	1985
Matthew O. Jackson	Stanford University	2015
D. Gale Johnson (died 2003)	University of Chicago	1991
Ronald W. Jones (died 2022)	University of Rochester	2001
Dale W. Jorgenson (died 2022)	Harvard University	1978
Lawrence F. Katz	Harvard University	2014
Lawrence R. Klein (died 2013)	University of Pennsylvania	1973
Tjalling C. Koopmans (died 1985)	Yale University	1969
János Kornai (died 2021)	Corvinus University of Budapest	2016
Rachel E. Kranton	Duke University	2021
Michael Kremer	The University of Chicago	2020
David M. Kreps	Stanford University	1997
Anne O. Krueger	Johns Hopkins University	1995
Simon Kuznets (died 1985)	Harvard University	1972
David Laibson	Harvard University	2019
David S. Landes (died 2013)	Harvard University	1983
Edward E. Leamer (died 2025)	University of California, Los Angeles	2025
Wassily Leontief (died 1999)	New York University	1974
Robert E. Lucas Jr. (died 2023)	University of Chicago	1981
Edmond Malinvaud (died 2015)	Institut National de la Statistique et des Etudes Economiques (INSEE)	1977
Charles F. Manski	Northwestern University	2009
Andreu Mas-Colell	Universitat Pompeu Fabra	1997
Eric S. Maskin	Harvard University	2008
Rosa L. Matzkin	University of California, Los Angeles	2022
Daniel L. McFadden	University of Southern California	1981
Lionel W. McKenzie (died 2010)	University of Rochester	1978
James Meade (died 1995)	University of Cambridge	1981
Robert C. Merton	Massachusetts Institute of Technology	1993
Paul R. Milgrom	Stanford University	2006
Jacob Mincer (died 2006)	Columbia University	2000
James A. Mirrlees (died 2018)	University of Cambridge	1999
Franco Modigliani (died 2003)	Massachusetts Institute of Technology	1973
James N. Morgan (died 2018)	University of Michigan	1975
Stephen Morris	Massachusetts Institute of Technology	2021
Dale T. Mortensen (died 2014)	Northwestern University	2013
Richard A. Musgrave (died 2007)	University of California, Santa Cruz	1986
Roger B. Myerson	The University of Chicago	2009
Marc Nerlove (died 2024)	University of Maryland, College Park	1979
Ariel Pakes	Harvard University	2017
Parag A. Pathak	Massachusetts Institute of Technology	2025
Edmund S. Phelps	Columbia University	1982
Monika Piazzesi	Stanford University	2023
Charles R. Plott	California Institute of Technology	2007
James M. Poterba	Massachusetts Institute of Technology	2015
Edward C. Prescott (died 2022)	Arizona State University	2008
Matthew Rabin	Harvard University	2019
Roy Radner (died 2022)	New York University	1975
Kenneth S. Rogoff	Harvard University	2010
Sherwin Rosen (died 2001)	University of Chicago	1998
Alvin E. Roth	Stanford University	2013
Cecilia E. Rouse	The Brookings Institution	2024
Emmanuel Saez	University of California, Berkeley	2023
Paul A. Samuelson (died 2009)	Massachusetts Institute of Technology	1970
Agnar Sandmo (died 2019)	Norwegian School of Economics	2009
Thomas J. Sargent	New York University	1983
Herbert E. Scarf (died 2015)	Yale University	1976
José A. Scheinkman	Columbia University	2008
Thomas C. Schelling (died 2016)	University of Maryland, College Park	1984
Theodore W. Schultz (died 1998)	University of Chicago	1974
Reinhard Selten (died 2016)	University of Bonn	1996
Lloyd S. Shapley (died 2016)	University of California, Los Angeles	1979
Christopher A. Sims (died 2026)	Princeton University	1989
Vernon L. Smith	Chapman University	1995
V. Kerry Smith	Arizona State University	2004
Robert M. Solow (died 2023)	Massachusetts Institute of Technology	1972
Hugo Sonnenschein (died 2021)	University of Chicago	1990
T. N. Srinivasan (died 2018)	Yale University	2000
George J. Stigler (died 1991)	University of Chicago	1975
Joseph E. Stiglitz	Columbia University	1988
Nancy L. Stokey	The University of Chicago	2004
Lawrence H. Summers	Harvard University	2002
Richard H. Thaler	The University of Chicago	2018
Jean Tirole	Toulouse School of Economics	2015
James Tobin (died 2002)	Yale University	1972
Robert M. Townsend	Massachusetts Institute of Technology	2012
Hirofumi Uzawa (died 2014)	University of Tokyo	1995
William S. Vickrey (died 1996)	Columbia University	1996
Oliver E. Williamson (died 2020)	University of California, Berkeley	1994
Robert B. Wilson	Stanford University	1994
