= List of members of the National Academy of Sciences (environmental sciences and ecology) =

This list is a subsection of the List of members of the National Academy of Sciences, which includes more than 7,000 members and international members of the United States National Academy of Sciences, both living and deceased, each affiliated with one of 31 disciplinary sections. Members are listed under their primary section, and each person's name, primary institution, and election year are given. For deceased members, the year of death is noted.

Name	Institution	Year
Zhisheng An	Chinese Academy of Sciences	2016
Juan J. Armesto (died 2024)	Pontificia Universidad Catolica de Chile	2021
Mary Arroyo	University of Chile	1999
Jayne Belnap	U.S. Geological Survey	2021
Elena M. Bennett	McGill University	2022
Emily S. Bernhardt	Duke University	2023
Joseph A. Berry	Carnegie Institution for Science	2015
Bert R. J. Bolin (died 2007)	University of Stockholm	1997
William J. Bond (died 2025)	University of Cape Town	2013
Frederick H. Bormann (died 2012)	Yale University	1973
James H. Brown	The University of New Mexico	2005
Nina Buchmann	ETH Zurich	2025
Mercedes Bustamante	University of Brasília	2021
John Cairns Jr. (died 2017)	Virginia Polytechnic Institute and State University	1991
Stephen R. Carpenter	University of Wisconsin-Madison	2001
Juan Carlos Castilla	Pontificia Universidad Católica de Chile	2003
Gerardo Ceballos González	Universidad Nacional Autónoma de México	2018
William L. Chameides	Duke University	1998
F. Stuart Chapin III	University of Alaska, Fairbanks	2004
Sallie W. Chisholm	Massachusetts Institute of Technology	2003
James S. Clark	Duke University	2020
Jonathan J. Cole (died 2023)	Cary Institute of Ecosystem Studies	2014
Phyllis D. Coley	University of Utah	2023
Rita R. Colwell	University of Maryland, College Park	2000
Richard M. Cowling	Stellenbosch University	2008
Paul J. Crutzen (died 2021)	Max Planck Institute for Chemistry	1994
Gretchen C. Daily	Stanford University	2005
Margaret B. Davis (died 2024)	University of Minnesota, Minneapolis	1982
Edward F. DeLong	University of Hawaiʻi at Mānoa	2008
Jared M. Diamond	University of California, Los Angeles	1979
Sandra M. Díaz	Universidad Nacional de Córdoba	2009
Robert E. Dickinson	University of California, Los Angeles	1988
Rodolfo Dirzo	Stanford University	2004
Scott C. Doney	University of Virginia	2025
Ellen R. Druffel	University of California, Irvine	2020
W. T. Edmondson (died 2000)	University of Washington	1973
James R. Ehleringer	University of Utah	2016
Paul R. Ehrlich (died 2026)	Stanford University	1985
Michael Elliott (died 2007)	IACR-Rothamsted	1996
James J. Elser	University of Montana	2019
James A. Estes (died 2025)	University of California, Santa Cruz	2014
Lenore Fahrig	Carleton University	2023
Paul G. Falkowski	Rutgers, The State University of New Jersey, New Brunswick	2007
Graham D. Farquhar	Australian National University	2013
Tom Fenchel	University of Copenhagen	2011
Christopher B. Field	Stanford University	2001
Mary K. Firestone	University of California, Berkeley	2017
Carl Folke	Royal Swedish Academy of Sciences	2017
Edward A. Frieman (died 2013)	University of California, San Diego	1981
Sherilyn C. Fritz	University of Nebraska-Lincoln	2025
James Neville Galloway	University of Virginia	2020
Wilford R. Gardner (died 2011)	University of California, Berkeley	1983
Edward D. Goldberg (died 2008)	University of California, San Diego	1980
Eville Gorham (died 2020)	University of Minnesota, Minneapolis	1994
Ilkka A. Hanski (died 2016)	University of Helsinki	2010
Susan P. Harrison	University of California, Davis	2018
Alan Hastings	University of California, Davis	2015
Mark E. Hay	Georgia Institute of Technology	2022
Tyrone B. Hayes	University of California, Berkeley	2023
Sarah Hobbie	University of Minnesota	2013
Robert D. Holt	University of Florida	2022
Jeremy B. C. Jackson	American Museum of Natural History	2019
Daniel H. Janzen	University of Pennsylvania	1992
Bo Barker Jørgensen	Aarhus University	2020
William A. Jury	University of California, Riverside	2000
Peter M. Kareiva	Aquarium of the Pacific	2011
David M. Karl	University of Hawaiʻi at Mānoa	2006
Donald Kennedy (died 2020)	Stanford University	1972
Nancy Knowlton	Smithsonian Institution	2013
Mimi A. R. Koehl	University of California, Berkeley	2001
Svitlana V. Krakovska	Ukrainian Hydrometeorological Center	2025
John R. Krebs	University of Oxford	2004
John E. Kutzbach (died 2021)	University of Wisconsin-Madison	2021
Sandra Lavorel	Centre National de la Recherche Scientifique	2020
John H. Lawton	No affiliation	2008
Estella Leopold (died 2024)	University of Washington	1974
Lisa A. Levin	University of California, San Diego	2024
Simon A. Levin	Princeton University	2000
Gene E. Likens	Cary Institute of Ecosystem Studies	1981
Thomas E. Lovejoy (died 2021)	George Mason University	2021
Jane Lubchenco	Oregon State University	1996
Ramon Margalef (died 2004)	University of Barcelona	1985
Pablo A. Marquet	Pontificia Universidad Católica de Chile	2018
Pamela A. Matson	Stanford University	1994
Robert May (died 2020)	University of Oxford	1992
Ernesto Medina	Venezuelan Institute for Scientific Research	1992
Mario J. Molina (died 2020)	Massachusetts Institute of Technology	1993
Harold A. Mooney	Stanford University	1982
Mary Ann Moran	University of Georgia	2021
François M. M. Morel	Princeton University	2009
William W. Murdoch	University of California, Santa Barbara	2008
Norman Myers (died 2019)	University of Oxford	1994
Dianne K. Newman	California Institute of Technology	2019
Carlos A. Nobre	University of São Paulo	2015
Eugene P. Odum (died 2002)	University of Georgia	1970
Richard S. Ostfeld	Cary Institute of Ecosystem Studies	2024
Jonathan T. Overpeck	University of Michigan	2024
Stephen W. Pacala	Princeton University	2007
Robert T. Paine (died 2016)	University of Washington	1986
Stephen R. Palumbi	Stanford University	2016
Ruth Patrick (died 2013)	Academy of Natural Sciences	1970
Ivette Perfecto	University of Michigan	2022
Hugh Possingham	University of Queensland	2016
Mary Power	University of California, Berkeley	2012
Nancy N. Rabalais	Louisiana State University	2021
James T. Randerson	University of California, Irvine	2017
Peter H. Raven	Missouri Botanical Garden	1977
Peter B. Reich	University of Michigan	2018
Robert E. Ricklefs	University of Missouri-St. Louis	2008
Andrea Rinaldo	École Polytechnique Fédérale de Lausanne	2012
G. Philip Robertson	Michigan State University	2025
Ignacio Rodríguez-Iturbe (died 2022)	Texas A&M University-College Station	2010
Benjamin D. Santer	Woods Hole Oceanographic Institution	2011
Marten Scheffer	Wageningen University and Research Centre	2019
David W. Schindler (died 2021)	University of Alberta	2002
William H. Schlesinger	Cary Institute of Ecosystem Studies	2003
Knut Schmidt-Nielsen (died 2007)	Duke University	1963
Stephen H. Schneider (died 2010)	Stanford University	2002
Thomas W. Schoener	University of California, Davis	1984
Daniel Simberloff	The University of Tennessee, Knoxville	2012
Ralph O. Slatyer (died 2012)	Australian National University	1976
John P. Smol	Queen's University	2025
George N. Somero	Stanford University	1988
Richard Southwood (died 2005)	University of Oxford	1988
John Terborgh	University of Florida	1989
James M. Tiedje	Michigan State University	2003
David Tilman	University of Minnesota, Minneapolis	2002
Susan E. Trumbore	Max Planck Institute for Biogeochemistry	2010
Monica G. Turner	University of Wisconsin-Madison	2004
Peter Vitousek	Stanford University	1992
Diana Harrison Wall (died 2024)	Colorado State University	2018
Cathy L. Whitlock	Montana State University	2018
Edward Wilson (died 2021)	Harvard University	1969
Carl R. Woese (died 2012)	University of Illinois at Urbana–Champaign	1988
George M. Woodwell (died 2024)	Woods Hole Research Center	1990
H. E. Wright Jr. (died 2015)	University of Minnesota	1977
Jizhong Zhou	University of Oklahoma	2025
