= List of members of the National Academy of Sciences =

This is an index of lists of members and international members of the United States National Academy of Sciences, organized by the academy's disciplinary sections. The linked lists include living and deceased members; for deceased members, the year of death is noted. Members are listed under their primary section, and each entry gives the person's name, primary institution, and election year.

Animal, nutritional and applied microbial sciences
See List of members of the National Academy of Sciences (animal, nutritional and applied microbial sciences)
Anthropology
See List of members of the National Academy of Sciences (anthropology)
Applied mathematical sciences
See List of members of the National Academy of Sciences (applied mathematical sciences)
Applied physical sciences
See List of members of the National Academy of Sciences (applied physical sciences)
Astronomy
See List of members of the National Academy of Sciences (astronomy)
Biochemistry
See List of members of the National Academy of Sciences (biochemistry)
Biophysics and computational biology
See List of members of the National Academy of Sciences (biophysics and computational biology)
Cellular and developmental biology
See List of members of the National Academy of Sciences (cellular and developmental biology)
Cellular and molecular neuroscience
See List of members of the National Academy of Sciences (cellular and molecular neuroscience)
Chemistry
See List of members of the National Academy of Sciences (chemistry)
Computer and information sciences
See List of members of the National Academy of Sciences (computer and information sciences)
Economic sciences
See List of members of the National Academy of Sciences (economic sciences)
Engineering sciences
See List of members of the National Academy of Sciences (engineering sciences)
Environmental sciences and ecology
See List of members of the National Academy of Sciences (environmental sciences and ecology)
Evolutionary biology
See List of members of the National Academy of Sciences (evolutionary biology)
Genetics
See List of members of the National Academy of Sciences (genetics)
Geology
See List of members of the National Academy of Sciences (geology)
Geophysics
See List of members of the National Academy of Sciences (geophysics)
Human environmental sciences
See List of members of the National Academy of Sciences (human environmental sciences)
Immunology and inflammation
See List of members of the National Academy of Sciences (immunology and inflammation)
Mathematics
See List of members of the National Academy of Sciences (mathematics)
Medical genetics, hematology and oncology
See List of members of the National Academy of Sciences (medical genetics, hematology and oncology)
Medical physiology and metabolism
See List of members of the National Academy of Sciences (medical physiology and metabolism)
Microbial biology
See List of members of the National Academy of Sciences (microbial biology)
Physics
See List of members of the National Academy of Sciences (physics)
Physiology and pharmacology
See List of members of the National Academy of Sciences (physiology and pharmacology)
Plant biology
See List of members of the National Academy of Sciences (plant biology)
Plant, soil and microbial sciences
See List of members of the National Academy of Sciences (plant, soil and microbial sciences)
Psychological and cognitive sciences
See List of members of the National Academy of Sciences (psychological and cognitive sciences)
Social and political sciences
See List of members of the National Academy of Sciences (social and political sciences)
Systems neuroscience
See List of members of the National Academy of Sciences (systems neuroscience)
