= Cathy Whitlock =

American earth scientist

- Born: Cathy Whitlock Barnosky; Syracuse, New York
- Education: Colorado College (BS); University of Washington (PhD)
- Awards: Member of the National Academy of Sciences (2018)
- Scientific career
- Workplaces: Montana State University; University of Oregon; University of Michigan; Trinity College Dublin; Carnegie Museum of Natural History
- Thesis: Late-Quaternary vegetational and climatic history of southwestern Washington (1983)
- Website: www.montana.edu/earthsciences/directory/1524735/cathy-whitlock

Cathy Lynn Whitlock is an American Earth Scientist and Professor at Montana State University. She is interested in Quaternary environmental change and palaeoclimatology and was a lead author of the 2017 Montana Climate Assessment. Whitlock has served as president of the American Quaternary Association and was elected to the National Academy of Sciences in 2018.

== Early life and education ==
Whitlock was born in Syracuse, New York. She grew up in Syracuse and Denver. Whitlock studied at Colorado College and was a member of Phi Beta Kappa. She was a graduate student at the University of Washington. In 1976 Whitlock was awarded a Thomas J. Watson Fellowship and worked at the University of Michigan. She joined Trinity College Dublin in 1983 on a NATO postdoctoral fellowship, based in the department of botany.

== Career and research ==
In 1984 Whitlock returned to the United States to take up a tenure-track position at the Carnegie Museum of Natural History. She is a palaeoecologist who studies environmental change over centuries and millennia. She moved to the University of Oregon in 1990, and was made Head of the Department of Geography in 1999. She studies the relationship between fire, climate, humans and vegetation over a range of timescales. She is interested in how these relationships change over different timescales.

Whitlock concentrates on the material that is found in lakes, extracting sediment cores that contain the fossils of pollen and particulate charcoal. Pollen grains can provide information about the plants that lived in the lake, meaning Whitlock can work out the vegetation and climate. By studying the charcoal in the sediments, Whitlock can track past fire. She has analysed the sediment cores in both wetlands and natural lakes. She uses the information she can extract from sediment cores to reconstruct historical vegetation, fire and climate. After the Yellowstone fires of 1988, Whitlock developed tools to reconstruct previous fires using the charcoal particulates contained within lake sediments. She monitored the lakes that were close to the Yellowstone fires for ten years, studying the amount of charcoal in small lakes in burned and unburned waterbeds. She studied the origins and amount of charcoal in these lakes and established the way that charcoal had been transported from the lake to the sediment cores she extracted. She compared the charcoal abundance during the 1988 fires to historical fires at the Yellowstone National Park. The methods she developed are still being used by fire scientists in a Global Charcoal Database.

In 2004 Whitlock joined Montana State University, where she acts as co-director of the Montana Institute on Ecosystems. She studied the impact of Rocky Mountain uplift on the climate of the Western United States. Whitlock believes that paleoecology is a powerful tool that should be used for the good of the planet, and her work in palaeo-inspired conservation is inspired by Herb Wright and Estella Leopold. She has also analysed vegetation in Patagonia, the impact of New Zealand fires on shrubland and agricultural land in Sicily. Whitlock studied the sediment cores in Gorgo Basso, monitoring the pollen levels. She identified that the Quercus ilex was the dominant tree in the landscape, until the beginning of the Roman period, when centuries of land use caused a rapid decline. Deforestation in New Zealand coincides with the arrival of the Māori people, and continued when the Europeans in the 1840s. She has used future climate projections to predict that rising temperatures will increase the prevalence of wildfires.

She was the lead author of the 2017 Montana Climate Assessment. In 2018 Whitlock was the first scientist based in a Montana institution to be elected to the National Academy of Sciences. She serves on the editorial boards of the journals The Holocene, Quaternary Research and Review of Palaeobotany and Palynology.

=== Awards and honors ===
- 2011 elected a Fellow of the American Association for the Advancement of Science (FAAAS)
- 2014 Edmund O Wilson Biodiversity Technology Pioneer Award
- 2015 Association for Women Geoscientists Professional Excellence Award in Research
- 2017 Fellow of the Geological Society of America
- 2017 American Quaternary Association Distinguished Career Award
- 2018 Elected member of the National Academy of Sciences
- 2018 Montana State University 125 Extraordinary Women
- 2018 Montana State University System Regents Professor
