= List of members of the National Academy of Sciences (physiology and pharmacology) =

This list is a subsection of the List of members of the National Academy of Sciences, which includes more than 7,000 members and international members of the United States National Academy of Sciences, both living and deceased, each affiliated with one of 31 disciplinary sections. Members are listed under their primary section, and each person's name, primary institution, and election year are given. For deceased members, the year of death is noted.

== Physiology and pharmacology ==
Name	Institution	Year
Peter Agre	Johns Hopkins Bloomberg School of Public Health	2000
Richard W. Aldrich	The University of Texas at Austin	2008
Susan G. Amara	National Institutes of Health	2004
Clay M. Armstrong	University of Pennsylvania	1987
Joseph Charles Aub (died 1973)	Harvard University	1957
Kurt G. Beam	University of Colorado School of Medicine	2012
Bruce P. Bean	Harvard Medical School	2014
Joseph A. Beavo	University of Washington School of Medicine	1996
Vann Bennett	Duke University Medical Center	2010
Robert W. Berliner (died 2002)	Yale School of Medicine	1968
Howard A. Bern (died 2012)	University of California, Berkeley	1973
Robert M. Berne (died 2001)	University of Virginia	1988
Michael J. Berridge (died 2020)	Babraham Institute	1999
Karl H. Beyer Jr. (died 1996)	Pennsylvania State University	1979
Francisco Bezanilla	The University of Chicago	2006
Lutz Birnbaumer	Pontifical Catholic University of Argentina	1995
James W. Black (died 2010)	University of Dundee	1991
Barbara A. Block	Stanford University	2023
John R. Brobeck (died 2009)	University of Pennsylvania	1975
Bernard B. Brodie (died 1989)	National Institutes of Health	1966
Chandler M. Brooks (died 1989)	State University of New York	1975
Maurice B. Burg (died 2022)	National Institutes of Health	1991
Arnold Burgen (died 2022)	University of Cambridge	1987
John J. Burns (died 2007)	Cornell University	1975
Michael D. Cahalan	University of California, Irvine	2010
Nancy Carrasco	Vanderbilt University School of Medicine	2015
William A. Catterall (died 2024)	University of Washington	1989
W. Knox Chandler (died 2017)	Yale University	1990
Julius H. Comroe Jr. (died 1984)	University of California, San Francisco	1961
Allan H. Conney (died 2013)	Rutgers University	1982
Erminio Costa (died 2009)	University of Illinois at Chicago	1982
André Cournand (died 1988)	Columbia University	1958
John W. Daly (died 2008)	National Institutes of Health	1997
Horace W. Davenport (died 2005)	University of Michigan	1974
Derek A. Denton (died 2022)	University of Melbourne	1995
Peter N. Devreotes	Johns Hopkins University School of Medicine	2005
Setsuro Ebashi (died 2006)	National Institutes of Natural Sciences, Japan	1996
Robert H. Edwards	University of California, San Francisco	2017
Vittorio Erspamer (died 1999)	University of Rome	1990
John H. Exton (died 2022)	Vanderbilt University	2001
Sérgio Henrique Ferreira (died 2016)	University of São Paulo	2002
Robert Fettiplace	University of Wisconsin-Madison	2021
Robert E. Forster (died 2021)	University of Pennsylvania	1973
Clara Franzini-Armstrong	University of Pennsylvania	1995
Robert F. Furchgott (died 2009)	State University of New York Downstate Medical Center	1990
David L. Garbers (died 2006)	University of Texas Southwestern Medical Center at Dallas	1993
Gerhard Giebisch (died 2020)	Yale University	1984
Alfred G. Gilman (died 2015)	University of Texas Southwestern Medical Center at Dallas	1985
Avram Goldstein (died 2012)	Stanford University	1980
Louis Goodman (died 2000)	University of Utah School of Medicine	1965
Ragnar Granit (died 1991)	Karolinska Institutet	1968
James D. Hardy (died 1985)	Yale University	1970
Steven C. Hebert (died 2008)	Yale School of Medicine	2005
Peter Hegemann	Humboldt University Berlin	2022
Yandell Henderson (died 1944)	Yale University	1923
Donald W. Hilgemann	UT Southwestern Medical Center	2021
Alan Hodgkin (died 1998)	University of Cambridge	1974
Joseph F. Hoffman (died 2022)	Yale University	1981
Jeffrey R. Holt	Harvard Medical School	2025
A. James Hudspeth (died 2025)	Rockefeller University	1991
Andrew Huxley (died 2012)	University of Cambridge	1979
Louis J. Ignarro	David Geffen School of Medicine at UCLA	1999
Holly A. Ingraham	University of California, San Francisco	2021
Ehud Y. Isacoff	University of California, Berkeley	2018
Laurinda A. Jaffe	University of Connecticut Health Center	2021
Lily Y. Jan	University of California, San Francisco School of Medicine	1995
Erik Jorgensen	University of Utah	2022
David Julius	University of California, San Francisco	2004
H. Ronald Kaback (died 2019)	University of California, Los Angeles	1987
Arthur Karlin (died 2024)	Columbia University	1999
Yoshito Kaziro (died 2011)	Kyoto University	2000
Ernst Knobil (died 2000)	University of Texas Health Science Center at Houston	1986
George B. Koelle (died 1997)	University of Pennsylvania	1972
Edwin G. Krebs (died 2009)	University of Washington	1973
Ching Kung	University of Wisconsin-Madison	2011
Eugene M. Landis (died 1987)	Harvard Medical School	1954
Ramón Latorre	Universidad de Valparaiso	1999
Susan E. Leeman	Boston University School of Medicine	1991
Greg Lemke	Salk Institute for Biological Studies	2025
Richard S. Lewis	Stanford University	2020
David P. Lloyd (died 1985)	Rockefeller Institute	1953
Oliver H. Lowry (died 1996)	Washington University School of Medicine in St. Louis	1964
David H. MacLennan (died 2020)	University of Toronto	2001
Gail Mandel	Oregon Health & Science University	2008
S. M. McCann (died 2007)	Pennington Biomedical Research Center	1983
Randall T. Moon	University of Washington	2015
Ferid Murad	The George Washington University	1997
Philip Needleman (died 2024)	Washington University in St. Louis	1987
Mark T. Nelson	University of Vermont	2019
Baldomero M. Olivera	University of Utah	2009
Krzysztof Palczewski	University of California, Irvine	2022
John R. Pappenheimer (died 2007)	Harvard University	1965
Charles R. Park (died 2016)	Vanderbilt University	1980
Ardèm Patapoutian	Scripps Research	2017
Eduardo A. Perozo	The University of Chicago	2023
Donald W. Pfaff	The Rockefeller University	1994
Tullio Pozzan (died 2022)	University of Padua	2006
C. Ladd Prosser (died 2002)	University of Illinois Urbana-Champaign	1974
Hermann Rahn (died 1990)	University at Buffalo, The State University of New York	1968
Harald Reuter (died 2022)	University of Bern	1997
Martin Rodbell (died 1998)	National Institute of Environmental Health Sciences	1987
Juan Carlos Saéz	Universidad de Valparaiso	2019
Charles H. Sawyer (died 2006)	University of California, Los Angeles	1980
James A. Shannon (died 1994)	National Institutes of Health	1965
Osamu Shimomura (died 2018)	Marine Biological Laboratory	2013
Frederick J. Sigworth	Yale School of Medicine	2016
Jens C. Skou (died 2018)	University of Aarhus	1988
C. Richard Taylor (died 1995)	Harvard University	1985
Chikashi Toyoshima	The University of Tokyo	2005
Roger Y. Tsien (died 2016)	University of California, San Diego	1998
Hans H. Ussing (died 2000)	University of Copenhagen	1980
Wylie Vale (died 2012)	Salk Institute for Biological Studies	1992
John Vane (died 2004)	William Harvey Research Foundation	1983
Ewald R. Weibel (died 2019)	University of Bern	1981
Gerald N. Wogan (died 2021)	Massachusetts Institute of Technology	1977
Ernest M. Wright	David Geffen School of Medicine at UCLA	2013
Nieng Yan	Tsinghua University	2019
Masashi Yanagisawa	UT Southwestern Medical Center	2003
Gary Yellen	Harvard Medical School	2024
