= Roberto Malinow =

American neuroscientist

- Born: Roberto Malinow; February 16, 1956 (age 70); Buenos Aires, Argentina
- Citizenship: United States
- Education: Reed College, BA Math; New York University, MD; UC Berkeley, PhD
- Known for: LTP mechanisms; LTD mechanisms; AMPA receptor dynamics; NMDA receptor signaling; synaptic basis of memory; Alzheimer’s Disease mechanisms; major depression mechanisms
- Awards: Metlife Foundation Award for Medical Research in Alzheimer's Disease (2003); National Academy of Sciences (2012); National Academy of Medicine (2015)
- Scientific career
- Fields: Neuroscience
- Workplaces: UC San Diego; Cold Spring Harbor
- Doctoral advisor: John P. Miller
- Other academic advisors: Richard Tsien
- Doctoral students: Wei Wei; Hiroshi Makino; Aneil Shirke; Neal Hessler; Dianna Pettit; Helen Hsieh; Dezhi Liao; Flavio Kamenetz; Song-Hai Shi; Louis Nguyen; Charles Kopec; Marc Marino; Jonathan Aow; Sage Aronson; Brad Monk; Stephanie Alfonso; Yvonne Pao
- Other notable students: Yasunori Hayashi; Nick Otmakhov; Thillai Koothan; Zach Mainen; Ingrid Ehrlich; Jose Esteban; Eleanore Real; Antonella Piccini; Jean-Christophe Poncer; Mirjana Maletic-Savatic; Jannic Boehm; Christophe Proulx; Sadegh Nabavi; Helmut Kessels; Julius Zhu; Simon Rumpel; Andres Barria; Bo Li; Joaquin Piriz; Chi-Hye Chung; Hailan Hu; Matt Klein; Steve Shabel; Ken Seidenman; Kim Dore; Zac Carrico; Shahid Zaman; Bruno Frenguelli; Adina Buxbaum; Takuya Takahashi; Alfonso Apicella
- Website: malinowlab.com

Roberto Malinow is an Argentine-born American neuroscientist at the University of California, San Diego. He is currently an emeritus distinguished professor of neurobiology and neurosciences, and held the Shiley Chair in Alzheimer's Disease Research at UCSD. In 2012 Dr. Malinow was elected to the National Academy of Sciences (Cellular and molecular neuroscience) and in 2015 was elected to the National Academy of Medicine.

Malinow has contributed many 'high-impact' neuroscience articles, with an h-index of 72 (72 research publications with at least 72 citations each), regarded as "truly unique".
