= List of members of the National Academy of Sciences (computer and information sciences) =

This list is a subsection of the List of members of the National Academy of Sciences, which includes members and international members of the United States National Academy of Sciences, living and deceased, each affiliated with one of the academy's disciplinary sections. Members are listed under their primary section, and each entry gives the person's name, primary institution, and election year. For deceased members, the year of death is noted.

== Computer and information sciences ==
Name	Institution	Year
Leonard M. Adleman	University of Southern California	2006
Dorit Aharonov	The Hebrew University of Jerusalem	2024
Alfred V. Aho	Columbia University	2022
Miklós Ajtai	Alfred Renyi Institute of Mathematics	2021
Frances E. Allen (died 2020)	IBM	2010
Sanjeev Arora	Princeton University	2018
John Backus (died 2007)	IBM	1974
C. Gordon Bell (died 2024)	Microsoft Research	2007
Yoshua Bengio	Université de Montréal	2025
Charles H. Bennett	IBM Thomas J. Watson Research Center	1997
Timothy Berners-Lee	Massachusetts Institute of Technology	2009
Manuel Blum	Carnegie Mellon University	2002
Dan Boneh	Stanford University	2023
Lewis M. Branscomb (died 2023)	Harvard University	1970
Frederick P. Brooks Jr. (died 2022)	University of North Carolina at Chapel Hill	2001
Rodney A. Brooks	Massachusetts Institute of Technology	2025
Vinton G. Cerf	Google	2020
Stephen A. Cook	University of Toronto	1985
Edward Emil David Jr. (died 2017)	EED, Inc.	1970
Jack J. Dongarra	University of Tennessee, Knoxville	2023
Cynthia Dwork	Harvard University	2014
Peter Elias (died 2001)	Massachusetts Institute of Technology	1975
Ronald Fagin	IBM Almaden Research Center	2020
Robert M. Fano (died 2016)	Massachusetts Institute of Technology	1978
James L. Flanagan (died 2015)	Rutgers, The State University of New Jersey	1983
G. David Forney Jr.	Massachusetts Institute of Technology	2003
Robert G. Gallager	Massachusetts Institute of Technology	1992
Shafrira Goldwasser	University of California, Berkeley	2004
Solomon W. Golomb (died 2016)	University of Southern California	2003
James N. Gray (died 2012)	Microsoft Corporation	2001
Robert B. Griffiths	Carnegie Mellon University	1987
Leonidas J. Guibas	Stanford University	2022
David Harel	Weizmann Institute of Science	2019
Juris Hartmanis (died 2022)	Cornell University	2013
John L. Hennessy	Stanford University	2002
Thomas A. Henzinger	Institute of Science and Technology Austria	2020
Tony Hoare (died 2026)	Microsoft Research Lab - Cambridge	2017
John E. Hopcroft	Cornell University	2009
Russell Impagliazzo	University of California, San Diego	2025
Piotr Indyk	Massachusetts Institute of Technology	2024
Robert E. Kahn	Corporation for National Research Initiatives	2015
Thomas Kailath	Stanford University	2000
Ravindran Kannan	University of California, Berkeley	2025
Anna Karlin	University of Washington	2021
Richard M. Karp	University of California, Berkeley	1980
Dina Katabi	Massachusetts Institute of Technology	2023
Lydia E. Kavraki	Rice University	2025
Michael Kearns	University of Pennsylvania	2021
Subhash A. Khot	New York University	2023
Jon M. Kleinberg	Cornell University	2011
Leonard Kleinrock	University of California, Los Angeles	2024
Donald E. Knuth	Stanford University	1975
Daphne Koller	Insitro, Inc.	2023
Leslie B. Lamport	No affiliation	2011
Butler W. Lampson	Massachusetts Institute of Technology	2005
Yann LeCun	New York University	2021
F. Thomson Leighton	Akamai Technologies	2008
Leonid A. Levin	Boston University	2019
Barbara H. Liskov	Massachusetts Institute of Technology	2012
Nancy A. Lynch	Massachusetts Institute of Technology	2016
Jitendra Malik	University of California, Berkeley	2015
John McCarthy (died 2011)	Stanford University	1989
Kurt Mehlhorn	Max Planck Institute for Informatics	2015
Silvio Micali	Massachusetts Institute of Technology	2007
Christos Papadimitriou	Columbia University	2009
David A. Patterson	University of California, Berkeley	2006
Judea Pearl	University of California, Los Angeles	2014
Toniann Pitassi	Columbia University	2022
William H. Press	University of Texas at Austin	1994
Michael O. Rabin	Harvard University	1984
Lawrence R. Rabiner	Rutgers University	1990
Jennifer Rexford	Princeton University	2020
Ronald L. Rivest	Massachusetts Institute of Technology	2004
Ronitt Rubinfeld	Massachusetts Institute of Technology	2022
Robert E. Schapire	Microsoft Research - New York City	2016
Jacob T. Schwartz (died 2009)	New York University	1976
Dana S. Scott	Carnegie Mellon University	1988
Adi Shamir	Weizmann Institute of Science	2005
Scott J. Shenker	University of California, Berkeley	2019
Peter W. Shor	Massachusetts Institute of Technology	2002
Joseph Sifakis	Université Grenoble-Alpes	2024
Daniel A. Spielman	Yale University	2017
Madhu Sudan	Harvard University	2017
Ivan E. Sutherland	Portland State University	1978
Éva Tardos	Cornell University	2013
Robert E. Tarjan	Princeton University	1987
Kenneth Thompson	Google	1985
Jeffrey D. Ullman	Stanford University	2020
Leslie G. Valiant	Harvard University	2001
Moshe Y. Vardi	Rice University	2015
Umesh V. Vazirani	University of California, Berkeley	2018
Sergio Verdú	No affiliation	2014
Andrew J. Viterbi	University of Southern California	1996
Avi Wigderson	Institute for Advanced Study	2013
Maurice V. Wilkes (died 2010)	University of Cambridge	1980
Shmuel Winograd (died 2019)	IBM	1978
Jack Keil Wolf (died 2011)	University of California, San Diego	2010
Mihalis Yannakakis	Columbia University	2018
Andrew Chi-Chih Yao	Tsinghua University	1998
Jacob Ziv (died 2023)	Technion Israel Institute of Technology	2004
