= List of members of the National Academy of Sciences (mathematics) =

This list is a subsection of the List of members of the National Academy of Sciences, which includes more than 7,000 members and international members of the United States National Academy of Sciences, both living and deceased, each affiliated with one of 31 disciplinary sections. Members are listed under their primary section, and each person's name, primary institution, and election year are given. For deceased members, the year of death is noted.

Name	Institution	Year elected
J. Frank Adams (died 1989)	University of Cambridge	1985
Ian Agol	University of California, Berkeley	2016
Manindra Agrawal	Indian Institute of Technology - Kanpur	2015
Lars V. Ahlfors (died 1996)	Harvard University	1953
James W. Alexander (died 1971)	Princeton University	1930
George Andrews	The Pennsylvania State University - University Park	2003
Vladimir I. Arnold (died 2010)	Russian Academy of Sciences	1983
James Arthur	University of Toronto	2014
Michael Artin	Massachusetts Institute of Technology	1977
Michael Aschbacher	California Institute of Technology	1990
Richard Askey (died 2019)	University of Wisconsin-Madison	1999
Michael Atiyah (died 2019)	University of Edinburgh	1978
Artur Ávila	University of Zurich	2019
Hyman Bass	University of Michigan	1982
Eric Bell (died 1960)	California Institute of Technology	1927
Elwyn Berlekamp (died 2019)	University of California, Berkeley	1999
Joseph Bernstein	Tel Aviv University	2004
Lipman Bers (died 1993)	Columbia University	1964
Manjul Bhargava	Princeton University	2013
R. H. Bing (died 1986)	The University of Texas at Austin	1965
Garrett Birkhoff (died 1996)	Harvard University	1968
George Birkhoff (died 1944)	Harvard University	1918
Joan S. Birman	Barnard College	2021
Jean-Michel Bismut	Universite Paris-Saclay	2021
Spencer Bloch	The University of Chicago	1994
Maxime Bôcher (died 1918)	Harvard University	1909
Salomon Bochner (died 1982)	Princeton University	1950
Fedor Bogomolov	New York University	2022
Enrico Bombieri	Institute for Advanced Study	1996
Richard Borcherds	University of California, Berkeley	2014
Armand Borel (died 2003)	Institute for Advanced Study	1987
Raoul Bott (died 2005)	Harvard University	1964
Jean Bourgain (died 2018)	Institute for Advanced Study	2011
Richard Brauer (died 1977)	Harvard University	1955
Haim Brezis (died 2024)	Rutgers, The State University of New Jersey	2003
Felix Browder (died 2016)	Rutgers, The State University of New Jersey	1973
William Browder (died 2025)	Princeton University	1980
Robert Bryant	Duke University	2007
Donald Burkholder (died 2013)	University of Illinois Urbana-Champaign	1992
Luis Caffarelli	The University of Texas at Austin	1991
Eugenio Calabi (died 2023)	University of Pennsylvania	1982
Alberto Calderón (died 1998)	The University of Chicago	1968
Lennart Carleson	KTH-Royal Institute of Technology	2006
Henri Cartan (died 2008)	Universite de Paris	1972
Sun-Yung Alice Chang	Princeton University	2009
Jeff Cheeger	New York University	1997
Shiing-Shen Chern (died 2004)	Nankai University	1961
Demetrios Christodoulou	ETH Zurich	2012
Fan Chung	University of California, San Diego	2024
Alonzo Church (died 1995)	University of California, Los Angeles	1978
Arthur Coble (died 1966)	University of Illinois at Urbana-Champaign	1924
Paul Cohen (died 2007)	Stanford University	1967
Alain Connes	Collège de France	1997
Peter Constantin	Princeton University	2021
Richard Courant (died 1972)	New York University	1955
Ennio De Giorgi (died 1996)	Scuola Normale Superiore di Pisa	1995
Percy Deift	New York University	2009
Pierre Deligne	Institute for Advanced Study	2007
Laura DeMarco	Harvard University	2020
Persi Diaconis	Stanford University	1995
Paul Dirac (died 1984)	Florida State University	1949
Simon Donaldson	Imperial College London	2000
J. L. Doob (died 2004)	University of Illinois Urbana-Champaign	1957
Jesse Douglas (died 1965)	Massachusetts Institute of Technology	1946
Vladimir Drinfeld	The University of Chicago	2016
Eugene Dynkin (died 2014)	Cornell University	1985
Samuel Eilenberg (died 1998)	Columbia University	1959
Yakov Eliashberg	Stanford University	2003
Noam Elkies	Harvard University	2017
Paul Erdős (died 1996)	Hungarian Academy of Sciences	1980
Alex Eskin	The University of Chicago	2015
Lawrence Craig Evans	University of California, Berkeley	2014
L. D. Faddeev (died 2017)	Russian Academy of Sciences	1990
Gerd Faltings	Max Planck Institute for Mathematics	2018
Herbert Federer (died 2010)	Brown University	1975
Charles Fefferman	Princeton University	1979
Walter Feit (died 2004)	Yale University	1977
William Feller (died 1970)	Princeton University	1960
Michael Freedman	Harvard University	1984
Igor Frenkel	Yale University	2018
Jürg Fröhlich	ETH Zurich	2020
William Fulton	University of Michigan	1997
Hillel Furstenberg	The Hebrew University of Jerusalem	1989
David Gabai	Princeton University	2011
Dennis Gaitsgory	Max Planck Institute for Mathematics	2020
David Gale (died 2008)	University of California, Berkeley	1983
Frederick Gehring (died 2012)	University of Michigan	1989
I. M. Gelfand (died 2009)	Rutgers, The State University of New Jersey	1970
Andrew Gleason (died 2008)	Harvard University	1966
James Glimm	Stony Brook University, The State University of New York	1984
Cameron Gordon	The University of Texas at Austin	2023
Daniel Gorenstein (died 1992)	Rutgers, The State University of New Jersey	1987
Ronald Graham (died 2020)	University of California, San Diego	1985
Ulf Grenander (died 2016)	Brown University	1996
Robert Griess	University of Michigan	2020
Phillip Griffiths	Institute for Advanced Study	1979
Mikhail Gromov	Institut des Hautes Études Scientifiques	1989
Benedict Gross (died 2025)	Harvard University	2004
Victor Guillemin	Massachusetts Institute of Technology	1985
Larry Guth	Massachusetts Institute of Technology	2021
Christopher Hacon	University of Utah	2018
Richard S. Hamilton (died 2024)	Columbia University	1999
Harish-Chandra (died 1983)	Institute for Advanced Study	1981
Joseph Harris	Harvard University	2011
Michael Harris	Columbia University	2022
F. Reese Harvey	Rice University	2024
F. Hirzebruch (died 2012)	Max Planck Institute for Mathematics	1986
Gerhard Hochschild (died 2010)	University of California, Berkeley	1979
Melvin Hochster	University of Michigan	1992
Helmut Hofer	Institute for Advanced Study	2008
Michael J. Hopkins	Harvard University	2010
Lars Hörmander (died 2012)	Lund University	1976
Roger E. Howe	Yale University	1994
Loo-Keng Hua (died 1985)	Academia Sinica	1982
Kiyosi Itô (died 2008)	Kyoto University	1998
Henryk Iwaniec	Rutgers, The State University of New Jersey, New Brunswick	2006
Nathan Jacobson (died 1999)	Yale University	1954
Arthur Jaffe	Harvard University	2000
Svetlana Jitomirskaya	University of California, Berkeley	2022
Peter Jones	Yale University	2008
Vaughan Jones (died 2020)	Vanderbilt University	1999
Mark Kac (died 1984)	University of Southern California	1965
Victor Kac	Massachusetts Institute of Technology	2013
Richard V. Kadison (died 2018)	University of Pennsylvania	1996
Rudolf Kalman (died 2016)	ETH Zurich	1994
Irving Kaplansky (died 2006)	University of California, Berkeley	1966
Masaki Kashiwara	Kyoto University	2023
Nicholas Katz	Princeton University	2004
David Kazhdan	The Hebrew University of Jerusalem	1990
Carlos Kenig	The University of Chicago	2014
Robion Kirby	University of California, Berkeley	2001
Sergiu Klainerman	Princeton University	2005
Stephen Kleene (died 1994)	University of Wisconsin-Madison	1969
Kunihiko Kodaira (died 1997)	Gakushuin University	1975
Joseph Kohn (died 2023)	Princeton University	1988
János Kollár	Princeton University	2005
A. Kolmogorov (died 1987)	Moscow State University	1967
Maxim Kontsevich	Institut des Hautes Études Scientifiques	2015
Bertram Kostant (died 2017)	Massachusetts Institute of Technology	1978
Bryna Kra	Northwestern University - Evanston	2019
Mark G. Krein (died 1989)	Ukrainian Academy of Sciences	1981
Martin Kruskal (died 2006)	Rutgers, The State University of New Jersey	1980
Jeffrey Lagarias	University of Michigan	2024
Serge Lang (died 2005)	Yale University	1985
Robert Langlands	Institute for Advanced Study	1993
H. Blaine Lawson	Stony Brook University, The State University of New York	1995
Peter Lax (died 2025)	New York University	1970
Jean Leray (died 1998)	Collège de France	1965
Norman Levinson (died 1975)	Massachusetts Institute of Technology	1967
Hans Lewy (died 1988)	University of California, Berkeley	1964
Elliott Lieb	Princeton University	1984
Fanghua Lin	New York University	2025
László Lovász	Alfred Renyi Institute of Mathematics	2012
Jacob Lurie	Institute for Advanced Study	2020
George Lusztig	Massachusetts Institute of Technology	1992
Mikhail Lyubich	Stony Brook University, The State University of New York	2022
Saunders Mac Lane (died 2005)	The University of Chicago	1949
George W. Mackey (died 2006)	Harvard University	1962
Robert MacPherson	Institute for Advanced Study	1992
Grigory Margulis	Yale University	2001
John Mather (died 2017)	Princeton University	1988
Barry Mazur	Harvard University	1982
Dusa McDuff	Barnard College	1999
Henry McKean (died 2024)	New York University	1980
Curtis McMullen	Harvard University	2007
Edward J. McShane (died 1989)	University of Virginia	1948
John Milnor	Stony Brook University, The State University of New York	1963
Maryam Mirzakhani (died 2017)	Stanford University	2016
Deane Montgomery (died 1992)	Institute for Advanced Study	1955
Robert Moore (died 1974)	University of Texas	1931
John Morgan	Columbia University	2009
Shigefumi Mori	Kyoto University	2017
Charles B. Morrey Jr. (died 1984)	University of California, Berkeley	1962
Jürgen Moser (died 1999)	ETH Zurich	1971
G. D. Mostow (died 2017)	Yale University	1974
Tomasz Mrowka	Massachusetts Institute of Technology	2015
Francis Murnaghan (died 1976)	Johns Hopkins University	1942
Aaron Naber	Institute for Advanced Study	2024
John F. Nash Jr. (died 2015)	Princeton University	1996
Edward Nelson (died 2014)	Princeton University	1997
Louis Nirenberg (died 2020)	New York University	1969
Sergei Novikov	University of Maryland, College Park	1994
Andrei Okounkov	Columbia University	2012
Donald Ornstein	Stanford University	1981
William F. Osgood (died 1943)	Harvard University	1904
Peter S. Ozsvath	Princeton University	2018
Jacob Palis (died 2025)	Institute for Pure and Applied Mathematics	2001
Charles Peirce (died 1914)	Johns Hopkins University	1877
Benjamin Peirce (died 1880)	resigned	1863
Duong H. Phong	Columbia University	2024
George Polya (died 1985)	Stanford University	1976
Sorin Popa	University of California, Los Angeles	2025
Daniel Quillen (died 2011)	University of Oxford	1978
Paul Rabinowitz	University of Wisconsin-Madison	1998
Marina Ratner (died 2017)	University of California, Berkeley	1993
Kenneth Ribet	University of California, Berkeley	2000
Herbert Robbins (died 2001)	Rutgers, The State University of New Jersey	1974
Abraham Robinson (died 1974)	Institute for Advanced Study	1974
Julia Robinson (died 1985)	University of California, Berkeley	1976
Gian-Carlo Rota (died 1999)	Massachusetts Institute of Technology	1982
Laure Saint-Raymond	Institut des Hautes Études Scientifiques	2022
Peter Sarnak	Princeton University	2002
Mikio Sato (died 2023)	Kyoto University	1993
M. M. Schiffer (died 1997)	Stanford University	1970
Wilfried Schmid	Harvard University	2020
Richard Schoen	Stanford University	1991
Jean-Pierre Serre	Collège de France	1979
James Serrin (died 2012)	University of Minnesota	1980
Conjeeveram Seshadri (died 2020)	Chennai Mathematical Institute	2010
Claude Shannon (died 2001)	Massachusetts Institute of Technology	1956
Scott Sheffield	Massachusetts Institute of Technology	2025
Barry Simon	California Institute of Technology	2019
James H. Simons (died 2024)	Simons Foundation	2014
Yakov G. Sinai	Princeton University	1999
Isadore Singer (died 2021)	Massachusetts Institute of Technology	1968
Yum-Tong Siu	Harvard University	2002
Stephen Smale	University of California, Berkeley	1970
Karen E. Smith	University of Michigan	2019
Paul Smith (died 1980)	Columbia University	1941
Robert M. Solovay	University of California, Berkeley	1986
D. C. Spencer (died 2001)	Princeton University	1961
Thomas C. Spencer	Institute for Advanced Study	2010
Gigliola Staffilani	Massachusetts Institute of Technology	2021
Richard P. Stanley	University of Miami	1995
Harold Stark	University of California, San Diego	2007
Charles Stein (died 2016)	Stanford University	1975
Elias M. Stein (died 2018)	Princeton University	1974
Robert Steinberg (died 2014)	University of California, Los Angeles	1985
Shlomo Sternberg (died 2024)	Harvard University	1986
Marshall Stone (died 1989)	University of Massachusetts Amherst	1938
William Story (died 1930)	Clark University	1908
Daniel Stroock (died 2025)	Massachusetts Institute of Technology	1995
Dennis Sullivan	Stony Brook University, The State University of New York	1983
Richard Swan	The University of Chicago	1976
Endre Szemerédi	Rutgers, The State University of New Jersey, New Brunswick	2010
Terence Tao	University of California, Los Angeles	2008
Alfred Tarski (died 1983)	University of California, Berkeley	1965
John Tate (died 2019)	Harvard University	1969
Clifford Taubes	Harvard University	1996
Richard Taylor	Stanford University	2015
Tracy Y. Thomas (died 1983)	University of California, Los Angeles	1941
John G. Thompson	University of Florida	1971
William Thurston (died 2012)	Cornell University	1983
Jacques Tits (died 2021)	Collège de France	1992
Karen Uhlenbeck	The University of Texas at Austin	1986
Gunther Uhlmann	University of Washington	2023
S. M. Ulam (died 1984)	University of Colorado	1966
H. S. Vandiver (died 1973)	The University of Texas at Austin	1934
Srinivasa Varadhan	New York University	1995
Akshay Venkatesh	Institute for Advanced Study	2023
Maryna Viazovska	Ecole Polytechnique Federale de Lausanne	2025
Marie-France Vignéras	Universite Paris Cite	2024
David Vogan, Jr.	Massachusetts Institute of Technology	2013
Karen Vogtmann	University of Warwick	2022
Dan-Virgil Voiculescu	University of California, Berkeley	2006
Claire Voisin	Institut de Mathematiques de Jussieu-Paris rive gauche	2016
Joseph Walsh (died 1973)	Harvard University	1936
André Weil (died 1998)	Institute for Advanced Study	1977
Hermann Weyl (died 1955)	Institute for Advanced Study	1940
George W. Whitehead (died 2004)	Massachusetts Institute of Technology	1972
Hassler Whitney (died 1989)	Princeton University	1945
Gordon Whyburn (died 1969)	University of Virginia	1951
Raymond L. Wilder (died 1982)	University of California, Santa Barbara	1963
Andrew Wiles	University of Oxford	1996
Jacob Wolfowitz (died 1981)	University of Illinois Urbana-Champaign	1974
Melanie Matchett Wood	Harvard University	2025
William Woodin	Harvard University	2023
Horng-Tzer Yau	Harvard University	2013
Shing-Tung Yau	Tsinghua University	1993
Lai-Sang Young	New York University	2020
Don Zagier	Max Planck Institute for Mathematics	2017
Oscar Zariski (died 1986)	Johns Hopkins University	1944
Efim Zelmanov	University of California, San Diego	2001
Antoni Zygmund (died 1992)	The University of Chicago	1960
