= Steven C. Hebert =

Nephrologist and professor (1946-2008)

Dr. Steven Hebert
- Born: 1946; Rockford, Illinois
- Died: April 15, 2008 (aged 61–62)
- Education: Florida State University; University of Florida
- Known for: His work in nephrology
- Spouse: Patricia Hebert

Steven C. Hebert, M.D., (b. 1946 in Rockford, Illinois—d. April 15, 2008), a board certified nephrologist, was the chair and C.N.H. Long Professor of Cellular and Molecular Physiology and professor of medicine at Yale University, beginning in 2000.

== Education ==
Hebert entered Florida State University at age 15 and earned a bachelor's degree in three years. He then obtained an M.D. at the University of Florida in 1970. He went on to complete his residency in internal medicine and a nephrology fellowship at the University of Alabama in Birmingham.

== Career ==
Before coming to Yale, Hebert was a faculty member at the University of Alabama in Birmingham, Eastern Virginia Medical School, the University of Texas Medical School at Houston, Harvard Medical School, and Vanderbilt University as director of the Division of Nephrology and the Ann and Roscoe R. Robinson Professor of Medicine.

With colleagues, he launched the biotech companies MariCal and Pearl Development Group.

His laboratory identified ROMK, a potassium excretion regulatory channel in the kidney outer medulla involved in Bartter's syndrome type II, two sodium chloride transporters, and a calcium-sensing receptor known as CaSR which led to the development of a new class of drugs that modulate calcium sensing receptor activity.

== Honors ==
- Homer W. Smith Award, top research prize, by the American Society of Nephrology.
- A.N. Richards Award, the International Society of Nephrology.
- Carl W. Gottschalk Distinguished Lectureship, American Society of Physiology.
- Member, American Society for Clinical Investigation in 1988.
- Member, Association of American Physicians in 1993.
- Elected to the National Academy of Sciences in 2005.
