= List of members of the National Academy of Sciences (cellular and molecular neuroscience) =

This list is a subsection of the List of members of the National Academy of Sciences, which includes more than 7,000 members and international members of the United States National Academy of Sciences, both living and deceased, each affiliated with one of 31 disciplinary sections. Members are listed under their primary section, and each person's name, primary institution, and election year are given. For deceased members, the year of death is noted.

== Cellular and molecular neuroscience ==
Name	Institution	Year
Susan L. Ackerman	University of California, San Diego	2019
Wolfhard Almers	Oregon Health & Science University	2006
Arturo Alvarez-Buylla	University of California, San Francisco	2021
Per Andersen (died 2020)	University of Oslo	1994
David J. Anderson	California Institute of Technology	2007
Silvia Arber	University of Basel	2020
Paola Arlotta	Harvard University	2025
Julius Axelrod (died 2004)	National Institutes of Health	1971
Cornelia Bargmann	Rockefeller University	2003
Ben A. Barres (died 2017)	Stanford University School of Medicine	2013
Allan I. Basbaum	University of California, San Francisco	2019
Denis Baylor (died 2022)	Stanford University	1993
Michael Bennett (died 2023)	Yeshiva University	1981
Anders Björklund	Lund University	2011
Floyd Bloom (died 2025)	Scripps Research Institute	1977
David Bodian (died 1992)	Johns Hopkins University School of Medicine	1958
Tobias Bonhoeffer	Max Planck Institute for Biological Intelligence	2020
Frank Brink Jr. (died 2007)	Rockefeller University	1959
Linda B. Buck	Fred Hutchinson Cancer Research Center	2003
Jean-Pierre Changeux	Institut Pasteur	1983
Moses V. Chao	New York University Langone Medical Center	2023
David Clapham	Howard Hughes Medical Institute	2006
Hollis Cline	Scripps Research Institute	2022
Melvin J. Cohen (died 1998)	Yale University	1975
Francis Crick (died 2004)	Salk Institute for Biological Studies	1969
Yang Dan	University of California, Berkeley	2018
Robert B. Darnell	The Rockefeller University	2014
Norman Davidson (died 2002)	California Institute of Technology	1960
Hallowell Davis (died 1992)	Washington University in St. Louis	1948
Pietro De Camilli	Yale School of Medicine	2001
Vincent G. Dethier (died 1993)	University of Massachusetts at Amherst	1965
Catherine Dulac	Harvard University	2015
John Eccles (died 1997)	University at Buffalo, The State University of New York	1966
Edward V. Evarts (died 1985)	National Institute of Mental Health	1976
Guoping Feng	Massachusetts Institute of Technology	2024
Te Pei Feng (died 1995)	Academia Sinica	1986
Gerald Fischbach	Simons Foundation	1984
Gordon Fishell	Harvard Medical School	2023
Louis B. Flexner (died 1996)	University of Pennsylvania	1964
Jordi Folch-Pi (died 1979)	Harvard University	1978
Edwin Furshpan (died 2019)	Harvard University	1982
David D. Ginty	Harvard Medical School	2017
Corey Goodman	venBio LLC	1995
Michael E. Greenberg	Harvard Medical School	2008
Paul Greengard (died 2019)	Rockefeller University	1978
Sten Grillner	Karolinska Institutet	2010
Susumu Hagiwara (died 1989)	University of California, Los Angeles	1978
Kristen M. Harris	University of Texas at Austin	2024
Haldan Keffer Hartline (died 1983)	The Rockefeller University	1948
Mary Elizabeth Hatten	The Rockefeller University	2017
Nathaniel Heintz	The Rockefeller University	2016
Edward Herbert (died 1987)	University of Oregon	1987
John Heuser	National Institutes of Health	2011
Bertil Hille	University of Washington	1986
Oliver Hobert	Columbia University	2024
Tomas Hökfelt	Karolinska Institute	1984
Christine E. Holt	University of Cambridge	2020
Richard L. Huganir	Johns Hopkins University School of Medicine	2004
Nancy Y. Ip	Hong Kong University of Science and Technology	2015
Leslie L. Iversen (died 2020)	University of Oxford	1986
Ivan A. Izquierdo (died 2021)	Pontifical Catholic University of Rio Grande do Sul	2007
Reinhard Jahn	Max Planck Institute for Multidisciplinary Sciences	2015
Yuh Nung Jan	University of California, San Francisco	1996
Thomas Jessell (died 2019)	Columbia University	2002
Yishi Jin	University of California, San Diego	2022
Eric R. Kandel	Columbia University	1974
Bernard Katz (died 2003)	University College London	1976
Seymour S. Kety (died 2000)	Harvard University	1962
Alex L. Kolodkin	Johns Hopkins University School of Medicine	2022
Stephen Kuffler (died 1980)	Harvard University	1964
Lynn Landmesser (died 2024)	Case Western Reserve University	2001
Martin G. Larrabee (died 2003)	Johns Hopkins University	1969
Virginia M.-Y. Lee	University of Pennsylvania	2025
Rita Levi-Montalcini (died 2012)	Institute of Cellular Biology and Neurobiology IBCN	1968
Jeff W. Lichtman	Harvard University	2014
Rodolfo Llinás	New York University Langone Medical Center	1986
Rafael Lorente de Nó (died 1990)	The Rockefeller University	1950
Konrad Lorenz (died 1989)	Osterreichischen Akademie der Wissenschaften	1966
Liqun Luo	Stanford University	2012
Robert Malenka	Stanford University School of Medicine	2011
Roberto Malinow	University of California, San Diego	2012
Eve Marder	Brandeis University	2007
Kelsey Catherine Martin	Simons Foundation	2024
Carol Ann Mason	Columbia University	2018
Susan McConnell	Stanford University	2011
Gero Miesenböck	University of Oxford	2025
Ricardo Miledi (died 2017)	University of California, Irvine	1989
Michelle Monje	Stanford University	2025
Shigetada Nakanishi	Kyoto University	2000
Jeremy Nathans	Johns Hopkins University School of Medicine	1996
Walle J. Nauta (died 1994)	Massachusetts Institute of Technology	1967
Erwin Neher	Max Planck Institute for Multidisciplinary Sciences	1989
Roger Nicoll	University of California, San Francisco	1994
Shosaku Numa (died 1992)	Kyoto University	1991
Sanford L. Palay (died 2002)	Harvard University	1977
Richard Palmiter	University of Washington School of Medicine	1988
Christine Petit	Institut Pasteur	2016
Mu-ming Poo	Chinese Academy of Sciences	2009
Stanley B. Prusiner	University of California, San Francisco	1992
Pasko Rakic	Yale School of Medicine	1985
Thomas Reese (died 2024)	National Institutes of Health	1987
Werner E. Reichardt (died 1992)	Max Planck Institute for Biological Cybernetics	1988
Eugene Roberts (died 2016)	City of Hope National Medical Center	1988
Jerzy E. Rose (died 1992)	University of Wisconsin-Madison	1972
John Rubenstein	University of California, San Francisco	2020
Timothy A. Ryan	Weill Cornell Medical College	2024
Bernardo L. Sabatini	Harvard Medical School	2019
Bert Sakmann	Max Planck Institute of Neurobiology	1993
Joshua Sanes	Harvard University	2002
Berta V. Scharrer (died 1995)	Albert Einstein College of Medicine	1967
Richard Scheller	No affiliation	2000
Francis O. Schmitt (died 1995)	Massachusetts Institute of Technology	1948
Erin M. Schuman	Max Planck Institute for Brain Research	2020
Edward Scolnick	Broad Institute	1984
Amita Sehgal	University of Pennsylvania	2016
Carla Shatz	Stanford University	1995
Kang Shen	Stanford University	2025
Hee-Sup Shin	Institute for Basic Science	2009
Eric Shooter (died 2018)	Stanford University	2000
Richard Sidman (died 2024)	Harvard University	1979
Solomon Snyder	Johns Hopkins University School of Medicine	1980
Louis Sokoloff (died 2015)	National Institutes of Health	1980
Nicholas C. Spitzer	University of California, San Diego	2013
Gunther Stent (died 2008)	University of California, Berkeley	1982
Charles Stevens (died 2022)	Salk Institute for Biological Studies	1982
Thomas C. Südhof	Stanford University School of Medicine	2002
Karel Svoboda	Allen Institute for Neural Dynamics	2015
Janos Szentagothai (died 1994)	Semmelweis University of Medicine	1972
Joseph Takahashi	University of Texas Southwestern Medical Center	2003
Marc Tessier-Lavigne	Stanford University	2005
Hans Thoenen (died 2012)	Max Planck Institute of Neurobiology	1996
Nikolaas Tinbergen (died 1988)	University of Oxford	1974
Tsuneo Tomita (died 1991)	Keio University	1982
Richard Tsien	New York University	1997
Gina Turrigiano	Brandeis University	2013
Victor C. Twitty (died 1967)	Stanford University	1950
Leslie B. Vosshall	Howard Hughes Medical Institute	2015
Christopher A. Walsh	Harvard Medical School	2018
Charles Weissmann (died 2025)	Scripps Research Institute	1989
Rachel I. Wilson	Harvard Medical School	2017
Rachel O. Wong	University of Washington	2021
Clinton N. Woolsey (died 1993)	University of Wisconsin-Madison	1960
King-Wai Yau	Johns Hopkins University School of Medicine	2010
Hongkui Zeng	Allen Institute for Brain Science	2023
Feng Zhang	Massachusetts Institute of Technology	2018
S. Lawrence Zipursky	University of California, Los Angeles	2009
Huda Zoghbi	Baylor College of Medicine	2004
Charles Zuker	Columbia University Vagelos College of Physicians and Surgeons	2004
