= List of members of the National Academy of Sciences (applied mathematical sciences) =

This list is a subsection of the List of members of the National Academy of Sciences, which includes members and international members of the United States National Academy of Sciences, living and deceased, each affiliated with one of the academy's disciplinary sections. Members are listed under their primary section, and each entry gives the person's name, primary institution, and election year. For deceased members, the year of death is noted.

== Applied mathematical sciences ==
Name	Institution	Year
Michael Aizenman	Princeton University	1997
David Aldous	University of California, Berkeley	2010
Theodore Anderson (died 2016)	Stanford University	1976
Rina F. Barber	University of Chicago	2025
Grigory Barenblatt (died 2018)	University of California, Berkeley	1997
M. S. Bartlett (died 2002)	University of Oxford	1993
Yoav Benjamini	Tel Aviv University	2020
John B. Bell	Lawrence Berkeley National Laboratory	2012
Gérard Ben Arous	New York University	2020
Bonnie Berger	Massachusetts Institute of Technology	2020
James Berger	Duke University	2003
Marsha Berger	Flatiron Institute	2000
Andrea L. Bertozzi	University of California, Los Angeles	2018
Peter Bickel	University of California, Berkeley	1986
David Blackwell (died 2010)	University of California, Berkeley	1965
Maury Bramson	University of Minnesota	2017
Leo Breiman (died 2005)	University of California, Berkeley	2001
Lawrence Brown	University of Pennsylvania	1990
Russel E. Caflisch	New York University	2019
Emmanuel Candès	Stanford University	2014
George F. Carrier (died 2002)	Harvard University	1967
Jennifer Tour Chayes	University of California, Berkeley	2019
Herman Chernoff (died 2026)	Harvard University	1980
Alexandre Chorin	University of California, Berkeley	1991
John Cocke (died 2002)	Thomas J. Watson Research Center	1993
Joel Cohen	Rockefeller University	1997
Ronald Coifman	Yale University	1998
Julian Cole (died 1999)	Rensselaer Polytechnic Institute	1976
Phillip Colella	Lawrence Berkeley National Laboratory	2004
David Cox (died 2022)	University of Oxford	1988
Gertrude Mary Cox (died 1978)	North Carolina State University	1975
Michael G. Crandall (died 2026)	University of California, Santa Barbara	2023
Constantine Dafermos	Brown University	2016
George Dantzig (died 2005)	Stanford University	1971
Ingrid Daubechies	Duke University	1998
Carl de Boor	University of Wisconsin–Madison	1997
Amir Dembo	Stanford University	2022
James Demmel	University of California, Berkeley	2011
Ronald DeVore	Texas A&M University	2017
Roland Dobrushin (died 1995)	Russian Academy of Sciences	1993
David Donoho	Stanford University	1998
Richard Durrett	Duke University	2007
Bradley Efron	Stanford University	1986
Alison Etheridge	University of Oxford	2023
Steven Neil Evans	University of California, Berkeley	2016
Lisa Fauci	Tulane University	2023
Stephen Fienberg (died 2016)	Carnegie Mellon University	1999
Wendell Fleming (died 2023)	Brown University	2012
Avner Friedman	Ohio State University	1993
Jerome H. Friedman	Stanford University	2010
Paul Garabedian (died 2010)	New York University	1975
Donald Geman	Johns Hopkins University	2015
Stuart Geman	Brown University	2011
Herman Goldstine (died 2004)	American Philosophical Society	1974
Gene H. Golub (died 2007)	Stanford University	1993
Ralph Gomory	New York University	1972
David Gottlieb (died 2008)	Brown University	2007
Leslie Greengard	Flatiron Institute	2006
Alice Guionnet	Ecole Normale Superieure de Lyon	2022
Morris H. Hansen (died 1990)	Westat	1976
Ted Harris (died 2005)	University of Southern California	1988
Trevor Hastie	Stanford University	2018
Herbert A. Hauptman (died 2011)	Hauptman-Woodward Medical Research Institute	1988
David Haussler	University of California, Santa Cruz	2006
Wassily Hoeffding (died 1991)	University of North Carolina at Chapel Hill	1976
Alan J. Hoffman (died 2021)	International Business Machines Corporation	1982
Harold Hotelling (died 1973)	University of North Carolina at Chapel Hill	1970
Thomas Hou	California Institute of Technology	2024
Louis Howard (died 2015)	Massachusetts Institute of Technology	1977
Fritz John (died 1994)	New York University	1964
Iain Johnstone	Stanford University	2005
Michael I. Jordan	University of California, Berkeley	2010
Samuel Karlin (died 2007)	Stanford University	1972
Robert Kass	Carnegie Mellon University	2023
Guinevere Kauffmann	Max Planck Institute for Astrophysics	2012
Joseph Keller (died 2016)	Stanford University	1973
Harry Kesten (died 2019)	Cornell University	1983
John Kingman	University of Bristol	2007
Daniel Kleitman	Massachusetts Institute of Technology	2024
Kenneth Lange	University of California, Los Angeles	2021
Greg Lawler	University of Chicago	2013
Erich Leo Lehmann (died 2009)	University of California, Berkeley	1978
Randall J. LeVeque	University of Washington	2021
Hans W. Liepmann (died 2009)	California Institute of Technology	1971
Thomas M. Liggett (died 2020)	University of California, Los Angeles	2008
Chia-Chiao Lin (died 2013)	Massachusetts Institute of Technology	1962
Xihong Lin	Harvard University	2023
Jun S. Liu	Harvard University	2025
Andrew Majda (died 2021)	New York University	1994
David W. McLaughlin	New York University	2002
John W. Miles (died 2008)	University of California, San Diego	1979
Cathleen Morawetz (died 2017)	New York University	1990
Frederick Mosteller (died 2006)	Harvard University	1974
David Mumford	Brown University	1975
Arkadi Nemirovski	Georgia Institute of Technology	2020
Yurii Nesterov	Corvinus University of Budapest	2022
Charles M. Newman	New York University	2004
Stanley Osher	University of California, Los Angeles	2005
George C. Papanicolaou	Stanford University	2000
Robin Pemantle	University of Pennsylvania	2024
Yuval Peres	Beijing Institute of Mathematical Sciences and Applications	2016
Charles Peskin	New York University	1995
Linda Petzold	University of California, Santa Barbara	2021
Dominique Picard	Universite Paris Cité	2023
Michael Powell (died 2015)	University of Cambridge	2001
Calyampudi Rao (died 2023)	University of Hyderabad	1995
Nancy Reid	University of Toronto	2016
Kathryn Roeder	Carnegie Mellon University	2019
Vladimir Rokhlin	Yale University	1999
Murray Rosenblatt (died 2019)	University of California, San Diego	1984
Donald Rubin	Harvard University	2010
Donald G. Saari	University of California, Irvine	2001
James Sethian	University of California, Berkeley	2013
Michael Shelley	Flatiron Institute	2022
Lawrence Shepp (died 2013)	Rutgers University	1989
David Siegmund	Stanford University	2002
David Slepian (died 2007)	Bell Labs	1977
Eduardo D. Sontag	Northeastern University	2025
Frank Spitzer (died 1992)	Cornell University	1981
Charles J. Stone (died 2019)	University of California, Berkeley	1993
Gilbert Strang	Massachusetts Institute of Technology	2009
Elizabeth A. Thompson	University of Washington	2008
Robert J. Tibshirani	Stanford University	2012
Lloyd Nick Trefethen	Harvard University	2025
John Tukey (died 2000)	Princeton University	1961
Grace Wahba	University of Wisconsin–Madison	2000
Larry A. Wasserman	Carnegie Mellon University	2016
Michael Waterman	University of Southern California	2001
Ruth J. Williams	University of California, San Diego	2012
Wing Hung Wong	Stanford University	2009
Margaret H. Wright	New York University	2005
Bin Yu	University of California, Berkeley	2014
Ofer Zeitouni	Weizmann Institute of Science	2020
