= Prabhu Pingali =

Professor in Economics and Nutritional Sciences

Prabhu Lakshminarayana Pingali is a professor at the Charles H. Dyson School of Applied Economics and Management, the Department of Global Development, and in the division of Nutritional Sciences at Cornell University. He is a foreign member of the U.S. National Academy of Sciences, and the founding director of the Tata-Cornell Institute. Before becoming a professor at Cornell, Pingali worked in agricultural development at the Bill and Melinda Gates Foundation.

== Education ==
Pingali graduated with an M.A. in economics from BITS Pilani in 1977. He went on to receive PhD in economics from North Carolina States University.

== Research ==
In his research at Cornell, Pingali focuses on the effective distribution and production of nutritious foods. He has advocated towards an increase in diversity of food options, and not just productivity in the production of grains.
