= Catherine Peichel =

American academic

- Awards: Burroughs Wellcome Career Award (2003–2008); Guggenheim Fellowship (2013)

Academic background
- Education: Princeton University (Ph.D.); University of California, Berkeley (B.A.)
- Thesis: Genetic and Molecular Analysis of the Mouse Ulnaless Locus (1991)

Academic work
- Discipline: Biology
- Sub-discipline: Evolutionary biology, Genetics
- Institutions: University of Bern; Fred Hutchinson Cancer Research Center; University of Washington

Catherine Peichel is an American geneticist who works at the Division of Evolutionary Ecology department of the University of Bern. Her research focuses on the genetic bases of speciation, adaptation, and phenotypic diversity, as well as the evolution of sex chromosomes. Much of her research uses three-spined stickleback fish (Gasterosteus aculeatus) as models, both in the lab and in wild populations. She was awarded the Burroughs Wellcome Career Award in the Biomedical Sciences in 2003 for her significant contributions in developing the stickleback as a model system for evolutionary genetics.

Peichel was elected to the American Academy of Arts and Sciences in 2020, and the National Academy of Sciences in 2023.
