= List of members of the National Academy of Sciences (astronomy) =

This list is a subsection of the List of members of the National Academy of Sciences, which includes more than 7,000 members and international members of the United States National Academy of Sciences, both living and deceased, each affiliated with one of 31 disciplinary sections. Members are listed under their primary section, and each person's name, primary institution, and election year are given. For deceased members, the year of death is noted.

Name	Institution	Year
Charles G. Abbot (died 1973)	Smithsonian Institution	1915
Charles Alcock	Center for Astrophysics | Harvard & Smithsonian	2001
Lawrence H. Aller (died 2003)	University of California, Los Angeles	1962
V. Ambartsumian (died 1996)	Byurakan Astronomical Observatory	1954
J. Roger P. Angel	University of Arizona	2000
David Arnett	University of Arizona	1985
Horace W. Babcock (died 2003)	Carnegie Institution for Science	1954
John N. Bahcall (died 2005)	Institute for Advanced Study	1976
Neta A. Bahcall	Princeton University	1997
Steven A. Balbus	University of Oxford	2015
Mitchell C. Begelman	University of Colorado Boulder	2024
S. Jocelyn Bell Burnell	University of Oxford	2005
Lars Bildsten	University of California, Santa Barbara	2018
James J. Binney	University of Oxford	2022
Roger D. Blandford	Stanford University	2005
John G. Bolton (died 1993)	Commonwealth Scientific and Industrial Research Organization	1980
J. Richard Bond	University of Toronto	2011
William J. Borucki	NASA Ames Research Center	2020
E. Margaret Burbidge (died 2020)	University of California, San Diego	1978
Bernard F. Burke (died 2018)	Massachusetts Institute of Technology	1970
Adam S. Burrows	Princeton University	2015
Daniela Calzetti	University of Massachusetts at Amherst	2020
Claude R. Canizares	Massachusetts Institute of Technology	1993
John E. Carlstrom	The University of Chicago	2002
Catherine Cesarsky	CEA Saclay	2004
S. Chandrasekhar (died 1995)	The University of Chicago	1955
David Charbonneau	Harvard University	2017
Roger A. Chevalier	University of Virginia	1996
Jørgen Christensen-Dalsgaard	Aarhus University	2021
George W. Clark (died 2023)	Massachusetts Institute of Technology	1980
Gerald Clemence (died 1974)	United States Naval Observatory	1952
Arthur D. Code (died 2009)	University of Arizona	1971
Judith G. Cohen	California Institute of Technology	2017
Marshall H. Cohen	California Institute of Technology	1984
Stirling A. Colgate (died 2013)	Los Alamos National Laboratory	1984
Francoise Combes	Paris Observatory	2023
Alexander Dalgarno (died 2015)	Center for Astrophysics | Harvard & Smithsonian	2001
Marc Davis	University of California, Berkeley	1991
Raymond Davis Jr. (died 2006)	University of Pennsylvania	1982
Gerard de Vaucouleurs (died 1995)	The University of Texas at Austin	1986
Bruce T. Draine	Princeton University	2007
Frank D. Drake (died 2022)	SETI Institute	1972
Alan Dressler	Carnegie Institution for Science	1996
Daniel Eisenstein	Harvard University	2014
Ronald D. Ekers	Commonwealth Scientific and Industrial Research Organization	2018
Richard S. Ellis	University College London	2024
Sandra M. Faber	University of California, Santa Cruz	1985
Andrew C. Fabian	University of Cambridge	2016
George Field (died 2024)	Center for Astrophysics | Harvard & Smithsonian	1989
Debra Ann Fischer	Yale University	2021
Alexei V. Filippenko	University of California, Berkeley	2009
Wendy L. Freedman	The University of Chicago	2003
Kenneth C. Freeman	Australian National University	2017
Herbert Friedman (died 2000)	U.S. Naval Research Laboratory	1960
Neil Gehrels (died 2017)	National Aeronautics and Space Administration	2010
Reinhard Genzel	Max Planck Institute for Extraterrestrial Physics	2000
Andrea M. Ghez	University of California, Los Angeles	2004
Riccardo Giacconi (died 2018)	Johns Hopkins University	1971
Leo Goldberg (died 1987)	Kitt Peak National Observatory	1958
Jesse L. Greenstein (died 2002)	California Institute of Technology	1957
James E. Gunn	Princeton University	1977
Fiona A. Harrison	California Institute of Technology	2014
Lee Hartmann	University of Michigan	2024
Stephen Hawking (died 2018)	University of Cambridge	1992
Chushiro Hayashi (died 2010)	Kyoto University	1989
Martha P. Haynes	Cornell University	2000
Timothy M. Heckman	Johns Hopkins University	2016
D. S. Heeschen (died 2012)	National Radio Astronomy Observatory	1971
Carl E. Heiles	University of California, Berkeley	1990
George H. Herbig (died 2013)	University of Hawaii at Manoa	1964
Lars E. Hernquist	Center for Astrophysics | Harvard & Smithsonian	2008
Fred Hoyle (died 2001)	University of Cambridge	1969
John P. Huchra (died 2010)	Center for Astrophysics | Harvard & Smithsonian	1993
Icko Iben Jr. (died 2025)	University of Illinois at Urbana–Champaign	1985
David C. Jewitt	University of California, Los Angeles	2005
Christine A. Jones Forman	Center for Astrophysics | Harvard & Smithsonian	2023
Steven M. Kahn	University of California, Berkeley	2025
Victoria M. Kaspi	McGill University	2010
K. I. Kellermann	National Radio Astronomy Observatory	1975
Robert C. Kennicutt Jr.	Texas A&M University	2006
Lisa J. Kewley	Australian National University	2021
Ivan King (died 2021)	University of Washington	1982
Robert P. Kirshner	Thirty Meter Telescope International Observatory	1998
John Kormendy	The University of Texas at Austin	2020
Chryssa Kouveliotou	The George Washington University	2013
Robert P. Kraft (died 2015)	University of California, Santa Cruz	1971
Shrinivas R. Kulkarni	California Institute of Technology	2003
R. B. Leighton (died 1997)	California Institute of Technology	1966
Frank J. Low (died 2009)	University of Arizona	1974
Willem J. Luyten (died 1994)	University of Minnesota	1970
Donald Lynden-Bell (died 2018)	University of Cambridge	1990
Roger Lynds (died 2023)	National Optical Astronomy Observatory	1974
Chung-Pei Ma	University of California, Berkeley	2022
Claire E. Max	University of California, Santa Cruz	2008
Nicholas U. Mayall (died 1993)	Kitt Peak National Observatory	1949
Michel G. Mayor	University of Geneva	2010
Richard A. McCray (died 2021)	University of Colorado at Boulder	1989
Christopher F. McKee	University of California, Berkeley	1992
Maura A. McLaughlin	West Virginia University	2024
Péter István Mészáros	The Pennsylvania State University - University Park	2021
William B. McKinnon	Washington University in St. Louis	2023
Dimitri Mihalas (died 2013)	Los Alamos National Laboratory	1981
James M. Moran	Center for Astrophysics | Harvard & Smithsonian	1998
W. W. Morgan (died 1994)	Yerkes Observatory	1956
Samuel Harvey Moseley Jr.	Quantum Circuits	2023
Guido Münch (died 2020)	California Institute of Technology	1967
Norman W. Murray	University of Toronto	2025
Ramesh Narayan	Center for Astrophysics | Harvard & Smithsonian	2013
Jerry E. Nelson (died 2017)	University of California, Santa Cruz	1996
Gerry Neugebauer (died 2014)	California Institute of Technology	1973
Otto E. Neugebauer (died 1990)	Institute for Advanced Study	1977
Jan H. Oort (died 1992)	Sterrewacht-Huygens Laboratorium of the Netherlands	1953
Ernst J. Öpik (died 1985)	Armagh Observatory	1975
Donald E. Osterbrock (died 2007)	University of California, Santa Cruz	1966
Eve C. Ostriker	Princeton University	2022
Jeremiah P. Ostriker (died 2025)	Princeton University	1974
Bohdan Paczyński (died 2007)	Princeton University	1984
Eugene N. Parker (died 2022)	University of Chicago	1967
P. James E. Peebles	Princeton University	1988
Manuel Peimbert	Universidad Nacional Autonoma de Mexico	1987
Arno A. Penzias (died 2024)	New Enterprise Associates	1975
C. H. F. Peters (died 1890)	Hamilton College	1876
George W. Preston	Carnegie Institution for Science	1977
Eliot Quataert	Princeton University	2020
V. Radhakrishnan (died 2011)	Raman Research Institute	1996
Anthony C. Readhead	California Institute of Technology	1995
Martin J. Rees	Trinity College, Cambridge	1982
Mark J. Reid	Center for Astrophysics | Harvard & Smithsonian	2019
George H. Rieke	University of Arizona	2011
Marcia J. Rieke	University of Arizona	2012
Adam G. Riess	Johns Hopkins University	2009
Morton S. Roberts (died 2024)	National Radio Astronomy Observatory	1983
Luis F. Rodríguez	Universidad Nacional Autonoma de Mexico	2008
Vera C. Rubin (died 2016)	Carnegie Institution for Science	1981
Martin Ryle (died 1984)	University of Cambridge	1975
E. E. Salpeter (died 2008)	Cornell University	1967
Anneila I. Sargent	California Institute of Technology	2021
Wallace L. W. Sargent (died 2012)	California Institute of Technology	2005
Paul L. Schechter	Massachusetts Institute of Technology	2003
Brian P. Schmidt	Australian National University	2008
Maarten Schmidt (died 2022)	California Institute of Technology	1978
Martin Schwarzschild (died 1997)	Princeton University	1956
Nicholas Z. Scoville	California Institute of Technology	2022
Sara Seager	Massachusetts Institute of Technology	2015
Michael J. Seaton (died 2007)	University of London	1986
Uroš Seljak	University of California, Berkeley	2019
Irwin I. Shapiro	Center for Astrophysics | Harvard & Smithsonian	1974
Stephen A. Shectman	Carnegie Institution for Science	2014
I. S. Shklovsky (died 1985)	Russian Academy of Sciences	1973
Frank H. Shu (died 2023)	National Tsinghua University	1987
David N. Spergel	Simons Foundation	2007
Hyron Spinrad (died 2015)	University of California, Berkeley	1988
Lyman Spitzer Jr. (died 1997)	Princeton University	1952
Volker Springel	Max Planck Institute for Astrophysics	2007
Charles C. Steidel	California Institute of Technology	2006
James M. Stone	Institute for Advanced Study	2022
Bengt Strömgren (died 1987)	University of Copenhagen	1971
Rashid A. Sunyaev	Max Planck Institute for Astrophysics	1991
Alexander S. Szalay	Johns Hopkins University	2023
Yasuo Tanaka (died 2018)	Max Planck Institute for Extraterrestrial Physics	1998
Harvey D. Tananbaum	Smithsonian Astrophysical Observatory	2005
Patrick Thaddeus (died 2017)	Center for Astrophysics | Harvard & Smithsonian	1987
Joseph H. Taylor Jr.	Princeton University	1981
Alan M. Title (died 2026)	Lockheed Martin Space Technology Advanced R&D Labs	2004
John L. Tonry	University of Hawaii at Manoa	2018
Alar Toomre	Massachusetts Institute of Technology	1983
Richard Tousey (died 1997)	Naval Research Laboratory	1960
Scott D. Tremaine	Institute for Advanced Study	2002
Robert J. Trumpler (died 1956)	Lick Observatory	1932
J. Anthony Tyson	University of California, Davis	1997
Andrzej Udalski	Warsaw University	2012
C. Megan Urry	Yale University	2016
Hendrik C. van de Hulst (died 2000)	Sterrewacht-Huygens Laboratorium of the Netherlands	1977
Ewine F. van Dishoeck	Leiden University	2001
Risa H. Wechsler	Stanford University	2025
David H. Weinberg	The Ohio State University	2023
William (Jack) Welch (died 2024)	University of California, Berkeley	1999
Ray J. Weymann	Carnegie Institution for Science	1984
Fred L. Whipple (died 2004)	Smithsonian Astrophysical Observatory	1959
Simon D. M. White	Max Planck Institute for Astrophysics	2007
Albert E. Whitford (died 2002)	University of California, Santa Cruz	1954
Olin C. Wilson (died 1994)	Carnegie Institution of Washington	1960
Robert W. Wilson	Center for Astrophysics | Harvard & Smithsonian	1979
Edward Wright	University of California, Los Angeles	2011
Rosemary F. Wyse	Johns Hopkins University	2025
Yakov Zeldovich (died 1987)	Russian Academy of Sciences	1979
