= V. Kerry Smith =

American environmental economist

Academic background
- Education: Rutgers University (AB, PhD)

Academic work
- Discipline: Environmental economics
- Institutions: Arizona State University
- Awards: AERE Distinguished Service Award

Vincent Kerry Smith is an American environmental economist. As of 2024 he is an Emeritus Professor of economics in the W. P. Carey School of Business at Arizona State University and was previously University Distinguished Professor and the Director of the Center for Environmental and Resource Economic Policy at North Carolina State University. Smith is known for his foundational research in environmental economics, is a research associate at the National Bureau of Economic Research, and was inducted in the National Academy of Sciences in 2004. Chicago Professor John A. List once described Smith as a "Renaissance Man of Economics" in praise of Smith's book The Economics of Environmental Risk. He has published more than 300 academic works that have been cited over 7,000 times, which includes 15 books and over 200 peer-reviewed articles.

== Academic career ==
Smith received his PhD in economics from Rutgers University in 1970. Following his PhD, he held positions at Bowling Green State University, Resources for the Future, and State University of New York at Binghamton until 1976. From 1979 to 1983, Smith was Professor of Economics at University of North Carolina Chapel Hill and was the Centennial Professor of Economics at Vanderbilt University from 1983 to 1987.

In 1987 Smith was hired as University Distinguished Professor at North Carolina State University. Smith briefly left NC State to serve as Arts and Sciences Professor Of Environmental Economics at Duke University in 1994 before returning to NC State in 1999. While at NC State, Smith founded the Camp Resources workshop for environmental economics in 1993, which has met annually since its establishment. Smith left NC State in 2006 to join the W. P. Carey School of Business at Arizona State University as an emeritus professor, a position he still holds.

== Awards and recognition ==
In 2004, Smith was elected to the National Academy of Sciences, one of very few environmental economists to achieve such a recognition. He was named a fellow of the Guggenheim Foundation and the AAEA. Smith also received a Distinguished Service Award in 1989 from the Association of Environmental and Resource Economists, the leading professional organization for environmental economists.
