= List of members of the National Academy of Sciences (chemistry) =

This list is a subsection of the List of members of the National Academy of Sciences, which includes members and international members of the United States National Academy of Sciences, living and deceased, each affiliated with one of the academy's disciplinary sections. Members are listed under their primary section, and each entry gives the person's name, primary institution, and election year. For deceased members, the year of death is noted.

== Chemistry ==
Name	Institution	Year
Héctor D. Abruña	Cornell University	2018
Lia Addadi	Weizmann Institute of Science	2017
Joanna Aizenberg	Harvard University	2019
Robert A. Alberty (died 2014)	Massachusetts Institute of Technology	1965
Berni J. Alder (died 2020)	Lawrence Livermore National Laboratory	1970
A. Paul Alivisatos	The University of Chicago	2004
Norman L. Allinger (died 2020)	University of Georgia	1991
Hans C. Andersen	Stanford University	1992
Fred C. Anson (died 2024)	California Institute of Technology	1988
Duilio Arigoni (died 2020)	ETH Zurich	1998
Edward M. Arnett (died 2022)	Duke University	1983
William O. Baker (died 2005)	Bell Labs	1961
Shankar Balasubramanian	University of Cambridge	2023
John D. Baldeschwieler	California Institute of Technology	1970
Carl Jonan Ballhausen (died 2010)	University of Copenhagen	1992
Phil S. Baran	Scripps Research	2017
Paul F. Barbara (died 2010)	The University of Texas at Austin	2006
Allen J. Bard (died 2024)	University of Texas at Austin	1982
Neil Bartlett (died 2008)	University of California, Berkeley	1979
Paul D. Bartlett (died 1997)	Harvard University	1947
Derek H. R. Barton (died 1998)	Texas A&M University	1970
Jacqueline K. Barton	California Institute of Technology	2002
Fred Basolo (died 2007)	Northwestern University	1979
Moungi Gabriel Bawendi	Massachusetts Institute of Technology	2007
Gregory P. Baxter (died 1953)	Harvard University	1916
Peter Beak (died 2021)	University of Illinois at Urbana–Champaign	2003
Jesse L. Beauchamp	California Institute of Technology	1981
Ronald P. Bell (died 1996)	University of Oxford	1972
Myron L. Bender (died 1988)	Northwestern University	1968
Stephen J. Benkovic	The Pennsylvania State University	1985
Sidney W. Benson (died 2011)	University of Southern California	1981
David N. Beratan	Duke University	2024
John E. Bercaw	California Institute of Technology	1990
Robert G. Bergman	University of California, Berkeley	1984
Bruce J. Berne (died 2020)	Columbia University	1998
Richard B. Bernstein (died 1990)	University of California, Los Angeles	1968
R. Stephen Berry (died 2020)	University of Chicago	1980
Richard Bersohn (died 2003)	Columbia University	1985
Jerome A. Berson (died 2017)	Yale University	1970
Carolyn R. Bertozzi	Stanford University	2005
Jacob Bigeleisen (died 2010)	Stony Brook University	1966
Donna G. Blackmond	Scripps Research	2021
Herman S. Bloch (died 1990)	AlliedSignal	1975
Alfred T. Blomquist (died 1977)	Cornell University	1960
Virgil Boekelheide (died 2003)	University of Oregon	1962
Dale L. Boger	Scripps Research	2014
Michel Boudart (died 2012)	Stanford University	1975
Frank Bovey (died 2003)	AT&T Bell Laboratories	1975
Steven G. Boxer	Stanford University	2008
John I. Brauman (died 2024)	Stanford University	1976
Ronald Breslow (died 2017)	Columbia University	1966
Leo Brewer (died 2005)	University of California, Berkeley	1959
Wallace R. Brode (died 1974)	National Bureau of Standards	1954
Maurice S. Brookhart	University of Houston	2001
Herbert C. Brown (died 2004)	Purdue University	1957
Gary W. Brudvig	Yale University	2025
Thomas C. Bruice (died 2019)	University of California, Santa Barbara	1974
Louis E. Brus (died 2026)	Columbia University	2004
George Büchi (died 1998)	Massachusetts Institute of Technology	1965
Stephen L. Buchwald	Massachusetts Institute of Technology	2012
A. David Buckingham (died 2021)	University of Cambridge	1992
Cynthia J. Burrows	University of Utah	2014
Alison Butler	University of California, Santa Barbara	2022
Theodore L. Cairns (died 1994)	DuPont Company	1966
Melvin Calvin (died 1997)	University of California, Berkeley	1954
Erick M. Carreira	ETH Zurich	2020
Alan Carrington (died 2013)	University of Southampton	1994
Emily A. Carter	Princeton Plasma Physics Laboratory	2008
Marvin H. Caruthers	University of Colorado Boulder	1994
Charles P. Casey (died 2025)	University of Wisconsin-Madison	1993
A. Welford Castleman Jr. (died 2017)	The Pennsylvania State University	1998
Sylvia T. Ceyer	Massachusetts Institute of Technology	1997
Garnet K. Chan	California Institute of Technology	2025
Orville L. Chapman (died 2004)	University of California, Los Angeles	1974
Chi-Ming Che	The University of Hong Kong	2013
Malcolm H. Chisholm (died 2015)	The Ohio State University	2005
George M. Church	Harvard Medical School	2011
Gerhard L. Closs (died 1992)	The University of Chicago	1974
Geoffrey Coates	Cornell University	2018
James P. Collman	Stanford University	1975
Robert E. Connick (died 2014)	University of California, Berkeley	1963
R. Graham Cooks	Purdue University	2015
John D. Corbett (died 2013)	Iowa State University	1992
E. J. Corey	Harvard University	1966
Robert B. Corey (died 1971)	California Institute of Technology	1970
John Cornforth (died 2013)	University of Sussex	1978
F. Albert Cotton (died 2007)	Texas A&M University	1967
Robert H. Crabtree	Yale University	2018
Donald J. Cram (died 2001)	University of California, Los Angeles	1961
Bryce Crawford Jr. (died 2011)	University of Minnesota	1956
F. Fleming Crim	University of Wisconsin-Madison	2001
Stanley J. Cristol (died 2008)	University of Colorado Boulder	1972
Christopher C. Cummins	Massachusetts Institute of Technology	2017
Robert F. Curl Jr. (died 2022)	Rice University	1997
David Y. Curtin (died 2011)	University of Illinois Urbana-Champaign	1964
Lawrence F. Dahl (died 2021)	University of Wisconsin–Madison	1988
Hongjie Dai	Stanford University	2016
Samuel J. Danishefsky	Memorial Sloan Kettering Cancer Center	1986
Donald J. Darensbourg	Texas A&M University-College Station	2022
Marcetta Y. Darensbourg	Texas A&M University-College Station	2017
William G. Dauben (died 1997)	University of California, Berkeley	1970
Ernest Davidson	University of Washington	1987
Juan J. de Pablo	New York University	2022
Scott E. Denmark	University of Illinois Urbana-Champaign	2019
Charles H. DePuy (died 2013)	University of Colorado Boulder	1999
Peter B. Dervan	California Institute of Technology	1986
Joseph M. DeSimone	Stanford University	2012
Michael J. S. Dewar (died 1997)	University of Florida	1983
François N. Diederich (died 2020)	ETH Zurich	2012
Carl Djerassi (died 2015)	Stanford University	1961
Christopher M. Dobson (died 2019)	University of Cambridge	2013
William Doering (died 2011)	Harvard University	1961
Dennis Dougherty	California Institute of Technology	2009
Harry G. Drickamer (died 2002)	University of Illinois Urbana-Champaign	1965
Jack D. Dunitz (died 2021)	ETH Zurich	1988
James L. Dye (died 2021)	Michigan State University	1989
Manfred Eigen (died 2019)	Max Planck Institute for Biophysical Chemistry	1966
Richard Eisenberg	University of Rochester	2010
Odile Eisenstein	Universite de Montpellier	2021
Kenneth B. Eisenthal	Columbia University	2000
Mostafa A. El-Sayed	Georgia Institute of Technology	1980
Robert Elderfield (died 1979)	Columbia University	1949
Ernest L. Eliel (died 2008)	The University of North Carolina at Chapel Hill	1972
Jonathan A. Ellman	Yale University	2025
Paul Hugh Emmett (died 1985)	Johns Hopkins University	1955
Richard R. Ernst (died 2021)	Swiss Federal Institute of Technology	1991
Gerhard Ertl	Max Planck Society for the Advancement of Science	2002
Albert J. Eschenmoser (died 2023)	ETH Zurich	1973
David A. Evans (died 2022)	Harvard University	1984
Michael D. Fayer	Stanford University	2007
John B. Fenn (died 2010)	Virginia Commonwealth University	2003
Ben L. Feringa	University of Groningen	2019
John D. Ferry (died 2002)	University of Wisconsin-Madison	1959
Robert W. Field	Massachusetts Institute of Technology	2013
Michael E. Fisher (died 2021)	University of Maryland, College Park	1983
Marshall Fixman (died 2016)	Colorado State University	1973
Graham R. Fleming	University of California, Berkeley	2007
Paul J. Flory (died 1985)	Stanford University	1953
Willis H. Flygare (died 1981)	University of Illinois at Urbana–Champaign	1974
George Flynn (died 2020)	Columbia University	2001
Karl Folkers (died 1997)	The University of Texas at Austin	1948
Joanna S. Fowler	Brookhaven National Laboratory	2003
Marye Anne Fox (died 2021)	University of California, San Diego	1994
Joseph S. Francisco	University of Pennsylvania	2013
Jean M. Fréchet	University of California, Berkeley	2000
Josef Fried (died 2001)	The University of Chicago	1971
Gerhart Friedlander (died 2009)	Brookhaven National Laboratory	1973
Cynthia M. Friend	The Kavli Foundation	2019
Richard A. Friesner	Columbia University	2016
Gregory C. Fu	California Institute of Technology	2014
Kenichi Fukui (died 1998)	Fukui Institute for Fundamental Chemistry	1981
Raymond M. Fuoss (died 1987)	University of Zurich	1951
Reynold C. Fuson (died 1979)	University of Illinois Urbana-Champaign	1944
Laura Gagliardi	The University of Chicago	2021
Miguel García-Garibay	University of California, Los Angeles	2023
Paul G. Gassman (died 1993)	University of Minnesota	1989
Marshall Gates (died 2003)	University of Rochester	1958
Samuel H. Gellman	University of Wisconsin	2013
Henry Gilman (died 1986)	Iowa State University	1945
William A. Goddard III	California Institute of Technology	1984
Vitalii Goldanskii (died 2001)	Russian Academy of Sciences	1995
Karen I. Goldberg	University of Pennsylvania	2018
Robert Gomer (died 2016)	University of Chicago	1981
Roy G. Gordon	Harvard University	1975
Véronique Gouverneur	University of Oxford	2025
Harry B. Gray	California Institute of Technology	1971
Clare P. Grey	University of Cambridge	2024
John T. Groves	Princeton University	2018
Robert Howard Grubbs (died 2021)	California Institute of Technology	1989
Martin Gruebele	University of Illinois at Urbana–Champaign	2013
Ernest Grunwald (died 2002)	Brandeis University	1971
Herbert S. Gutowsky (died 2000)	University of Illinois Urbana-Champaign	1960
Norman Hackerman (died 2007)	Robert A. Welch Foundation	1971
Jack Halpern (died 2018)	The University of Chicago	1984
Sharon Hammes-Schiffer	Princeton University	2013
Louis Hammett (died 1987)	Columbia University	1943
George S. Hammond (died 2005)	Allied Chemical Corporation	1963
David Harker (died 1991)	Hauptman-Woodward Medical Research Institute	1997
Charles B. Harris (died 2020)	University of California, Berkeley	2002
John F. Hartwig	University of California, Berkeley	2012
Craig J. Hawker	University of California, Santa Barbara	2022
M. Frederick Hawthorne (died 2021)	University of Missouri	1973
Martin Head-Gordon	University of California, Berkeley	2015
Clayton H. Heathcock	University of California, Berkeley	1995
Eric J. Heller	Harvard University	2006
Russell J. Hemley	University of Illinois at Chicago	2001
Dudley R. Herschbach	Texas A&M University-College Station	1967
Joseph O. Hirschfelder (died 1990)	University of Wisconsin-Madison	1953
Ralph F. Hirschmann (died 2009)	University of Pennsylvania	1999
Wilson Ho	University of California, Irvine	2013
James L. Hoard (died 1993)	Cornell University	1972
Robin M. Hochstrasser (died 2013)	University of Pennsylvania	1982
Dorothy Hodgkin (died 1994)	University of Oxford	1971
Brian M. Hoffman	Northwestern University	2006
Roald Hoffmann	Cornell University	1972
Richard H. Holm (died 2021)	Harvard University	1975
Donald F. Hornig (died 2013)	Harvard University	1957
Kendall N. Houk	University of California, Los Angeles	2010
Linda Hsieh-Wilson	California Institute of Technology	2022
Rolf Huisgen (died 2020)	LMU Munich	1989
John R. Huizenga (died 2014)	University of Rochester	1976
Noel S. Hush (died 2019)	University of Sydney	2011
Clyde A. Hutchison Jr. (died 2005)	The University of Chicago	1963
James T. Hynes	University of Colorado Boulder	2011
James A. Ibers (died 2021)	Northwestern University	1984
Barbara Imperiali	Massachusetts Institute of Technology	2010
Eric Jacobsen	Harvard University	2008
John R. Johnson (died 1983)	Cornell University	1948
William S. Johnson (died 1995)	Stanford University	1952
Mark Johnson	Yale University	2014
Harold S. Johnston (died 2012)	University of California, Berkeley	1965
Jiri Jonas	University of Illinois at Urbana–Champaign	1985
William D. Jones	University of Rochester	2022
William L. Jorgensen	Yale University	2011
Joshua Jortner	Tel Aviv University	1997
Daniel Kahne	Harvard University	2019
Emil T. Kaiser (died 1988)	The Rockefeller University	1987
Mercouri Kanatzidis	Northwestern University	2024
Isabella Karle (died 2017)	Naval Research Laboratory	1978
Jerome Karle (died 2013)	Naval Research Laboratory	1976
Martin Karplus (died 2024)	Harvard University	1967
Michael Kasha (died 2013)	Florida State University	1971
Joseph Katz (died 2008)	Argonne National Laboratory	1973
Frederick Kaufman (died 1985)	University of Pittsburgh	1980
Walter Kauzmann (died 2009)	Princeton University	1964
Jeffery W. Kelly	Scripps Research	2023
Frederick Keyes (died 1976)	Massachusetts Institute of Technology	1930
Chaitan Khosla	Stanford University	2020
Laura Kiessling	Massachusetts Institute of Technology	2007
James L. Kinsey (died 2014)	Rice University	1991
John Kirkwood (died 1959)	Cornell University	1942
George B. Kistiakowsky (died 1982)	Harvard University	1939
Michael L. Klein	Temple University	2009
William Klemperer (died 2017)	Harvard University	1969
William Standish Knowles (died 2012)	Monsanto Company	2004
Jay K. Kochi (died 2008)	University of Houston	1982
Izaak Kolthoff (died 1993)	University of Minnesota	1958
Harold W. Kroto (died 2016)	Florida State University	2006
Clifford P. Kubiak	University of California, San Diego	2020
Paul C. Lauterbur (died 2007)	University of Illinois Urbana-Champaign	1985
Yuan T. Lee	Academia Sinica (Taiwan)	1979
Jean-Marie Lehn	Universite de Strasbourg	1980
Nelson J. Leonard (died 2006)	California Institute of Technology	1955
Stephen Leone	University of California, Berkeley	1995
Richard Lerner (died 2021)	Scripps Research Institute	1991
Marsha I. Lester	University of Pennsylvania	2016
Robert L. Letsinger (died 2014)	Northwestern University	1986
Raphael Levine	The Hebrew University of Jerusalem	1999
Donald Levy	The University of Chicago	1988
Jack Lewis (died 2014)	Robinson College	1987
Willard Libby (died 1980)	The University of Chicago	1950
Charles Lieber	Lieber Research Group	2004
Samuel C. Lind (died 1965)	University of Minnesota	1930
W. Carl Lineberger (died 2023)	University of Colorado at Boulder	1983
Stephen Lippard	Massachusetts Institute of Technology	1989
David R. Liu	Harvard University	2021
Franklin A. Long (died 1999)	University of California, Irvine	1962
Jeffrey R. Long	University of California, Berkeley	2023
Lewis G. Longsworth (died 1981)	Rockefeller Institute	1947
Alan G. MacDiarmid (died 2007)	The University of Texas at Dallas	2002
David MacMillan	Princeton University	2019
Nancy Makri	University of Illinois Urbana-Champaign	2023
Thomas E. Mallouk	University of Pennsylvania	2015
Rudolph A. Marcus (died 2026)	California Institute of Technology	1970
John L. Margrave (died 2003)	Rice University	1974
Herman Francis Mark (died 1992)	Polytechnic University of Brooklyn	1961
Tobin Marks	Northwestern University	1993
Todd J. Martinez	Stanford University	2019
Carl S. Marvel (died 1988)	University of Arizona	1938
Krzysztof Matyjaszewski	Carnegie Mellon University	2019
James M. Mayer	Yale University	2024
Heather D. Maynard	University of California, Los Angeles	2025
Donald S. McClure (died 2017)	Princeton University	1982
Harden M. McConnell (died 2014)	Stanford University	1965
Fred McLafferty (died 2021)	Cornell University	1982
Egbert (Bert) W. Meijer	Eindhoven University of Technology	2022
Jerrold Meinwald (died 2018)	Cornell University	1969
Thomas J. Meyer	The University of North Carolina at Chapel Hill	1994
Albert Meyers (died 2007)	Colorado State University	1994
Josef Michl (died 2024)	University of Colorado at Boulder	1986
William Miller	University of California, Berkeley	1987
Scott Miller	Yale University	2020
David Milstein	Weizmann Institute of Science	2018
Chad Mirkin	Northwestern University	2010
Kurt Mislow (died 2017)	Princeton University	1972
W.E. Moerner	Stanford University	2007
C. Bradley Moore (died 2025)	Northwestern University	1986
Jeffrey S. Moore	University of Illinois Urbana-Champaign	2015
Teruaki Mukaiyama (died 2018)	Kitasato Institute	2004
Shaul Mukamel	University of California, Irvine	2015
Robert S. Mulliken (died 1986)	The University of Chicago	1936
Catherine J. Murphy	University of Illinois Urbana-Champaign	2015
Royce W. Murray (died 2022)	University of North Carolina at Chapel Hill	1991
Ei-ichi Negishi (died 2021)	Purdue University	2014
Daniel M. Neumark	University of California, Berkeley	2015
Melvin S. Newman (died 1993)	The Ohio State University	1956
Kyriacos Costa Nicolaou	Rice University	1996
Abraham Nitzan	University of Pennsylvania	2015
Daniel G. Nocera	Harvard University	2009
Richard M. Noyes (died 1997)	University of Oregon	1977
Ryōji Noyori	Japan Science and Technology Agency	2003
Kyoko Nozaki	The University of Tokyo	2024
Ralph G. Nuzzo	University of Illinois Urbana-Champaign	2021
Teri W. Odom	Northwestern University	2023
George Andrew Olah (died 2017)	University of Southern California	1976
Monica Olvera de la Cruz	Northwestern University	2012
Larry Overman	University of California, Irvine	1996
Leo Paquette (died 2019)	Ohio State University	1983
Charles S. Parmenter (died 2025)	Indiana University	1995
Robert Parr (died 2017)	University of North Carolina at Chapel Hill	1973
George Parshall (died 2019)	E. I. du Pont de Nemours & Company	1984
Linus Pauling (died 1994)	Linus Pauling Institute	1933
Ralph Pearson (died 2022)	University of California, Santa Barbara	1974
John Perdew	Temple University	2011
Isadore Perlman (died 1991)	Lawrence Berkeley National Laboratory	1963
Jonas Peters	California Institute of Technology	2024
George C. Pimentel (died 1989)	University of California, Berkeley	1966
Alexander Pines (died 2024)	University of California, Berkeley	1988
Kenneth Pitzer (died 1997)	University of California, Berkeley	1949
John Charles Polanyi	University of Toronto	1978
John A. Pople (died 2004)	Northwestern University	1977
George Porter (died 2002)	Imperial College London	1974
C. Dale Poulter	University of Utah	2016
Frederick Power (died 1927)	US Department of Agriculture	1924
Vladimir Prelog (died 1998)	ETH Zurich	1961
Ilya Prigogine (died 2003)	Free University of Brussels	1967
Anna Marie Pyle	Yale University	2023
Lawrence Que Jr.	University of Minnesota	2022
C. N. R. Rao	Jawaharlal Nehru Centre for Advanced Scientific Research	1990
Mark Ratner	Northwestern University	2002
Kenneth Raymond	University of California, Berkeley	1997
Julius Rebek	Scripps Research	1994
David Reichman	Columbia University	2025
Tadeus Reichstein (died 1996)	University of Basel	1952
Charles Norwood Reilley (died 1981)	University of North Carolina at Chapel Hill	1977
Howard Reiss (died 2015)	University of California, Los Angeles	1977
Peter Rentzepis	Texas A&M University	1978
Stuart A. Rice (died 2024)	The University of Chicago	1968
Geraldine L. Richmond	University of Oregon	2011
John D. Roberts (died 2016)	California Institute of Technology	1956
Gregory H. Robinson	University of Georgia	2021
Amy Rosenzweig	Northwestern University	2017
John Ross (died 2017)	Stanford University	1976
Frederick Rossini (died 1990)	Carnegie Mellon University	1951
Peter Rossky	Rice University	2011
F. Sherwood Rowland (died 2012)	University of California, Irvine	1978
Melanie Sanford	University of Michigan	2017
Lewis H. Sarett (died 1999)	Merck & Co.	1977
Alan M. Sargeson (died 2008)	Australian National University	1996
Richmond Sarpong	University of California, Berkeley	2025
Martin Saunders	Yale University	1998
Jean-Pierre Sauvage	Universite de Strasbourg	2019
Jean-Michel Saveant (died 2020)	Centre National de la Recherche Scientifique	2001
Richard J. Saykally	University of California, Berkeley	1999
George C. Schatz	Northwestern University	2005
Alanna Schepartz	University of California, Berkeley	2014
Harold Scheraga (died 2020)	Cornell University	1966
Stuart Schreiber	Broad Institute	1995
Richard R. Schrock	University of California, Riverside	1992
Peter Schultz	Scripps Research	1993
Peter Schuster	University of Vienna	2009
Helmut Schwarz	Technical University of Berlin	2018
Glenn T. Seaborg (died 1999)	University of California, Berkeley	1948
Dieter Seebach	ETH Zurich	2007
Nikolai Semenov (died 1986)	Semenov Institute of Chemical Physics	1963
Jonathan L. Sessler	The University of Texas at Austin	2021
Dietmar Seyferth (died 2020)	Massachusetts Institute of Technology	2001
K. Barry Sharpless	Scripps Research	1985
John C. Sheehan (died 1992)	Massachusetts Institute of Technology	1957
David Shirley (died 2021)	University of California, Berkeley	1978
Harrison Shull (died 2003)	Indiana University Bloomington	1969
Robert J. Silbey (died 2011)	Massachusetts Institute of Technology	2003
Richard B. Silverman	Northwestern University	2023
Howard Ensign Simmons Jr. (died 1997)	E.I. du Pont de Nemours & Company	1975
John H. Sinfelt (died 2011)	Exxon Research & Engineering Company	1979
Philip S. Skell (died 2010)	The Pennsylvania State University	1977
James L. Skinner	University of Wisconsin–Madison	2012
Richard E. Smalley (died 2005)	Rice University	1990
Charles Phelps Smyth (died 1990)	Princeton University	1955
Edward I. Solomon	Stanford University	2005
Gabor A. Somorjai (died 2025)	University of California, Berkeley	1979
Frank Spedding (died 1984)	Iowa State University	1952
Shannon S. Stahl	University of Wisconsin–Madison	2023
Peter Stang	University of Utah	2000
Walter H. Stockmayer (died 2004)	Dartmouth College	1956
J. Fraser Stoddart (died 2024)	Northwestern University	2014
Gilbert Stork (died 2017)	Columbia University	1960
Andrew Streitwieser (died 2022)	University of California, Berkeley	1969
Galen Stucky	University of California, Santa Barbara	2008
Samuel I. Stupp	Northwestern University	2020
Kenneth S. Suslick	University of Illinois Urbana-Champaign	2024
Norman Sutin (died 2022)	Brookhaven National Laboratory	1990
Timothy M. Swager	Massachusetts Institute of Technology	2008
D. Stanley Tarbell (died 1999)	Vanderbilt University	1959
Henry Taube (died 2005)	Stanford University	1959
T. Don Tilley	University of California, Berkeley	2023
David A. Tirrell	California Institute of Technology	2006
Max Tishler (died 1989)	Wesleyan University	1953
Alexander R. Todd (died 1997)	University of Cambridge	1955
Andrei Tokmakoff	The University of Chicago	2022
F. Dean Toste	University of California, Berkeley	2020
Barry Trost	Stanford University	1980
Donald Truhlar	University of Minnesota	2009
John C. Tully	Yale University	1997
Anthony L. Turkevich (died 2002)	The University of Chicago	1967
Nicholas J. Turro (died 2012)	Columbia University	1981
Claudia Turro	The Ohio State University	2024
Veronica Vaida	University of Colorado Boulder	2020
Joan S. Valentine	University of California, Los Angeles	2005
Richard P. Van Duyne (died 2019)	Northwestern University	2010
Eugene E. van Tamelen (died 2009)	Stanford University	1968
Frederick T. Wall (died 2010)	University of California, San Diego	1961
Cheves Walling (died 2007)	University of Utah	1964
John C. Warner (died 1989)	Carnegie Mellon University	1956
Michael R. Wasielewski	Northwestern University	2021
Harry Wasserman (died 2013)	Yale University	1987
John S. Waugh (died 2014)	Massachusetts Institute of Technology	1974
Samuel Isaac Weissman (died 2007)	Washington University in St. Louis	1966
Paul Wender	Stanford University	2003
Frank H. Westheimer (died 2007)	Harvard University	1954
Henry Lord Wheeler (died 1914)	Yale University	1909
George M. Whitesides	Harvard University	1978
Kenneth B. Wiberg	Yale University	1967
Benjamin Widom (died 2025)	Cornell University	1974
Geoffrey Wilkinson (died 1996)	Imperial College London	1975
John Warren Williams (died 1988)	University of Wisconsin-Madison	1952
Robert R. Williams (died 1965)	Bell Telephone Laboratories	1945
E. Bright Wilson (died 1992)	Harvard University	1947
Bernhard Witkop (died 2010)	National Institutes of Health	1969
Peter T. Wolczanski	Cornell University	2024
Alfred P. Wolf (died 1998)	Brookhaven National Laboratory	1988
Peter Wolynes	Rice University	1991
Chi-Huey Wong	Scripps Research	2002
Robert Burns Woodward (died 1979)	Harvard University	1953
Karen L. Wooley	Texas A&M University	2020
Kurt Wüthrich	Scripps Research	1992
Ralph W. Wyckoff (died 1994)	National Institutes of Health	1949
Xiaoliang Sunney Xie	Peking University	2011
Omar Yaghi	University of California, Berkeley	2018
Vivian Yam	The University of Hong Kong	2012
Peidong Yang	University of California, Berkeley	2016
John T. Yates Jr. (died 2015)	University of Pittsburgh	1996
William Gould Young (died 1980)	University of California, Los Angeles	1951
Martin T. Zanni	University of Wisconsin–Madison	2025
Richard Zare	Stanford University	1976
Ahmed H. Zewail (died 2016)	California Institute of Technology	1989
Howard E. Zimmerman (died 2012)	University of Wisconsin-Madison	1980
