= Michael N. Mautner =

Hungarian chemistry and astrobiology researcher (born 1942)

Michael Noah Mautner (born February 19, 1942, in Budapest, Hungary) is a researcher in physical chemistry, astrobiology and astroecology. He currently serves as research professor at Virginia Commonwealth University with an interest in bioethics.

Mautner was born on February 19, 1942, in Budapest, Hungary. He received his B.Sc. from Hebrew University in 1966, his M.Sc. from Georgetown University in 1968, and his Ph.D. from Rockefeller University (with F. H. Field) in 1975. Mautner became interested in the idea of directed panspermia when he was studying at New York’s Rockefeller University in the midst of the Cold War’s nuclear standoff, when he felt “our survival really became a question.” Mautner served as associate and assistant professor at the Rockefeller University, adjunct professor and senior fellow at the University of Canterbury, Marsden Fellow and Senior Research Fellow Lincoln University, and Research Chemist at the National Institute of Standards and Technology. He served on the editorial boards of "Space Science and Resources" and "Astrobiology", and member of the Chemistry Board and Space Settlement Board of the Lifeboat Foundation.

In 1995, Mautner founded the volunteer-based The Panspermia Society (Society for Life in Space - SOLIS), that aims to expand life in space by directed panspermia missions. The SOLIS program is motivated by biotic ethics that value our family of self-propagating gene/protein life, and panbiotic ethics that seeks to start life in new solar systems.

Some of Mautner's published writing:

- Solvation of the guanidinium ion in pure aqueous environments: A theoretical study from an “Ab initio”-based polarizable force field (2017) C Houriez, M Meot-Ner, M Masella The Journal of Physical Chemistry B 121 (50), 11219-11228
- Space ecology (2016) MN Mautner, S Park Star Ark: A Living, Self-Sustaining Spaceship, 255-286
- Extrapolating single organic ion solvation thermochemistry from simulated water nanodroplets (2016) JP Coles, C Houriez, M Meot-Ner, M Masella The Journal of Physical Chemistry B 120 (35), 9402-9409
- Simulated solvation of organic ions II: Study of linear alkylated carboxylate ions in water nanodrops and in liquid water. Propensity for air/water interface and convergence to … (2015) C Houriez, M Meot-Ner, M Masella The Journal of Physical Chemistry B 119 (36), 12094-12107
- What is the structure of the naphthalene–benzene heterodimer radical cation? Binding energy, charge delocalization, and unexpected charge-transfer interaction in stacked dimer … (2015) IK Attah, SP Platt, M Meot-Ner, MS El-Shall, R Peverati, M Head-Gordon The Journal of Physical Chemistry Letters 6 (7), 1111-1118
- Protonated polycyclic aromatic nitrogen heterocyclics: proton affinities, polarizabilities, and atomic and ring charges of 1–5-ring ions (2015) RGAR Maclagan, S Gronert, M Meot-Ner The Journal of Physical Chemistry A 119 (1), 127-139
- Protonation energies of 1–5-ring polycyclic aromatic nitrogen heterocyclics: Comparing experiment and theory (2015) A Wiseman, LA Sims, R Snead, S Gronert, RGAR Maclagan, M Meot-Ner The Journal of Physical Chemistry A 119 (1), 118-126
- In situ biological resources: Soluble nutrients and electrolytes in carbonaceous asteroids/meteorites. Implications for astroecology and human space populations (2014) MN Mautner Planetary and Space Science 104, 234-243
- Hydrogen bonding of the naphthalene radical cation to water and methanol and attachment of the naphthalene ion to extended hydrogen bonding chains (2014) IK Attah, SP Platt, M Meot-Ner, MS El-Shall, SG Aziz, AO Alyoubi Chemical Physics Letters 613, 45-53
- Simulated solvation of organic ions: Protonated methylamines in water nanodroplets. Convergence toward bulk properties and the absolute proton solvation enthalpy (2014) C Houriez, M Meot-Ner, M Masella The Journal of Physical Chemistry B 118 (23), 6222-6233
- Astroecology, cosmo-ecology, and the future of life (2014) MN Mautner Acta Societatis Botanicorum Poloniae 83 (4), 449
- Seeding the universe with life: securing our cosmological future (2010) MN Mautner Journal of Cosmology 5, 982-994
- Life‐centered ethics, and the human future in space (2009) MN Mautner Bioethics 23 (8), 433-440
- Meteorite Models of Astrochemistry and Astrobiology
  - 1. Gas/Grain Interactions and Catalysis in the Solar Nebula (2008) MN Mautner Asteroids, Comets, Meteors 2008 1405, 8019
  - 2. Soluble Carbon and Electrolytes in Carbonaceous Chondrites (2008) MN Mautner Asteroids, Comets, Meteors 2008 1405, 8020
  - 3. Microbial and Brine Shrimp Bioassays of Carbonaceous Chondrites (2008) MN Mautner Asteroids, Comets, Meteors 2008 1405, 8021
- Microprobe analysis of brine shrimp grown on meteorite extracts (2007) J Kennedy, MN Mautner, B Barry, A Markwitz Nuclear Instruments and Methods in Physics Research Section B: Beam
- Lunar Gene Banks for Endangered Species (2006) MN Mautner Cell Preservation Technology 4 (3), 224-225
- Associative charge transfer reactions. temperature effects and mechanism of the gas-phase polymerization of propene initiated by a benzene radical cation (2006) Y Ibrahim, M Meot-Ner Mautner, MS El-Shall The Journal of Physical Chemistry A 110 (27), 8585-8592
- Meteorite nanoparticles as Models for Interstellar Grains: Synthesis and Preliminary Characterization (2006) M. N. Mautner, V. Abdelsayed, M. S. El-Shall, J. D. Thrower, S. D. Green, M. P. Collings and M. R. S. McCoustra Faraday Discussions 133, 103-112
- Planetary Bioresources and Astroecology (2002): A detailed study in Icarus on using meteorites as planetary soils.

== See also ==
- Astroecology
- Gas phase ion chemistry
- Directed panspermia
