= Łukasz Łuczaj =

Polish botanist (born 1972)

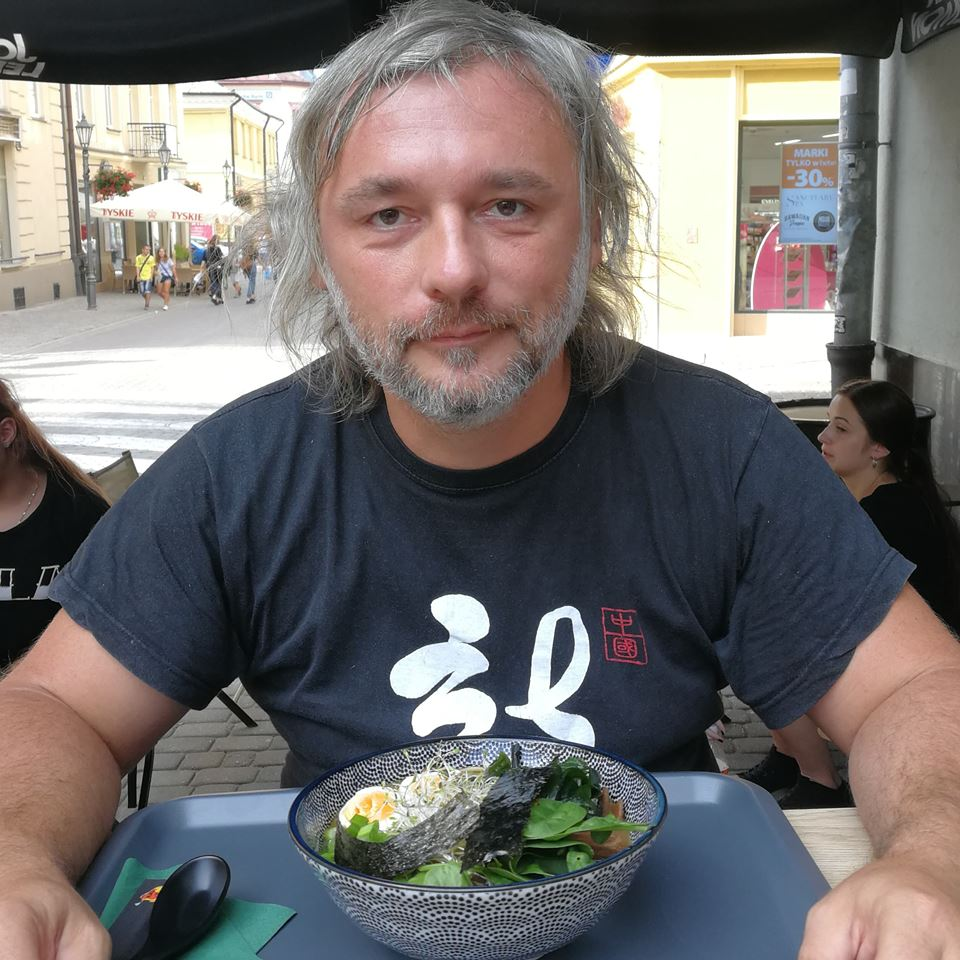
- Łuczaj in 2020
- Born: September 27, 1972; Krosno, Poland
- Scientific career
- Fields: Botany
- Workplaces: University of Warsaw; University of Rzeszów
- Website: lukaszluczaj.pl

Łukasz Jakub Łuczaj (September 27, 1972) is a Polish botanist, professor of biological sciences at University of Rzeszów. He is known for his work in the field of ethnobotany, particularly focusing on wild edible plants. Łuczaj is also a YouTuber and nature conservation activist, contributing extensively to the popularization of botanical knowledge and ecological practices.

== Life and career ==
Łukasz Łuczaj attended Mikołaj Kopernik I High School in Krosno, where he was a scholarship holder of the Polish Children's Fund. He pursued his higher education at the University of Warsaw, obtaining a degree in environmental biology in 1994. His master's thesis explored the spread of new shrub species in the Białowieża Forest. In 1999, he completed his doctoral studies at the University of Warsaw with a thesis titled Vegetation Structure and Edge Effects in the Forest-Meadow Contact Zone, supervised by Janusz Faliński. During his doctoral studies, he worked at the Botanical Garden in Warsaw.

After settling in Pietrusza Wola in the Podkarpacie region, Łukasz Łuczaj established a wild garden on his farm, focusing on maximizing biodiversity. By 2021, his garden housed over 500 different tree species. He is a pioneer of the wild garden movement in Poland and frequently conducts workshops on wild cooking and gardening.

In 2011, Łukasz Łuczaj joined the University of Rzeszów as a lecturer. He later became an associate professor and in 2023, was awarded full professorship in biological sciences. His research primarily revolves around plant ecology and ethnobotany, with a specific interest in folk taxonomy and wild edible plants. He has supervised three doctoral dissertations and serves on the editorial boards of several scientific journals, including Journal of Ethnobiology and Ethnomedicine and Acta Societatis Botanicorum Poloniae. He also created the Polish journal Etnobiologia Polska which ran from 2011 to 2021.

Łukasz Łuczaj has conducted extensive field research on plant use across various regions including China, Laos, the Caucasus, and the Balkans. In 2020, he was recognized in a ranking by Stanford University published in PLOS Biology, highlighting him as one of the world's top scientists based on bibliometric indices.

=== Conservation and public engagement ===
Łukasz Łuczaj is actively involved in nature conservation efforts, particularly in the Podkarpackie region. He advocates for the protection of rivers from regulation and has developed meadow seed mixtures to promote the growth of native, often endangered species. He has also called for the less frequent mowing of urban meadows to support biodiversity.

As a publicist and populariser of science, Łukasz Łuczaj has contributed to various publications, including the magazines ‘Fairy’ and ‘Kitchen’, as well as the quarterly ‘Przekrój’. He maintains a blog in both Polish and English, and his YouTube channel on wild edible plants has garnered over 73,000 subscribers.

In October 2025, he criticized Ethnographic Museum of Kraków for not providing access to the public toilet in the museum to him and his two friends. In response, the museum accused Łuczaj of inspiring hate speech against the museum's worker.

=== Personal life ===
His sister Justyna Łuczaj-Salej is a film director and his daughter Nasim Łuczaj is a poet.
