= Chemical physics =

Subdiscipline of chemistry and physics

Chemical physics is a branch of physics that studies chemical processes from a physical point of view. It focuses on understanding the physical properties and behavior of chemical systems, using principles from both physics and chemistry. This field investigates physicochemical phenomena using techniques from atomic and molecular physics and condensed matter physics.

The United States Department of Education defines chemical physics as "A program that focuses on the scientific study of structural phenomena combining the disciplines of physical chemistry and atomic/molecular physics. Includes instruction in heterogeneous structures, alignment and surface phenomena, quantum theory, mathematical physics, statistical and classical mechanics, chemical kinetics, and laser physics."

== Distinction between chemical physics and physical chemistry ==
While at the interface of physics and chemistry, chemical physics is distinct from physical chemistry as it focuses more on using physical theories to understand and explain chemical phenomena at the microscopic level, such as quantum mechanics, statistical mechanics, and molecular dynamics. Meanwhile, physical chemistry uses a broader range of methods, such as thermodynamics and kinetics, to study the physical nature of chemical processes. Physical chemistry deals with the physical properties and behavior of matter in chemical reactions, covering a broader range of topics such as thermodynamics, kinetics, and spectroscopy, and often links the macroscopic and microscopic chemical behavior. The distinction between the two fields still needs to be clarified as both fields share common grounds. Scientists often practice in both fields during their research, as there is significant overlap in the topics and techniques used. Journals like PCCP (Physical Chemistry Chemical Physics) cover research in both areas, highlighting their overlap.

== History ==
The term "chemical physics" in its modern sense was first used by the German scientist A. Eucken, who published "A Course in Chemical Physics" in 1930. Prior to this, in 1927, the publication "Electronic Chemistry" by V. N. Kondrat'ev, N. N. Semenov, and Iu. B. Khariton hinted at the meaning of "chemical physics" through its title. The Institute of Chemical Physics of the Academy of Sciences of the USSR was established in 1931. In the United States, "The Journal of Chemical Physics" has been published since 1933.

In 1964, the General Electric Foundation established the Irving Langmuir Award in Chemical Physics to honor outstanding achievements in the field of chemical physics. Named after the Nobel Laureate Irving Langmuir, the award recognizes significant contributions to understanding chemical phenomena through physics principles, impacting areas such as surface chemistry and quantum mechanics.

== What chemical physicists do ==
Chemical physicists investigate the structure and dynamics of ions, free radicals, polymers, clusters, and molecules. Their research includes studying the quantum mechanical aspects of chemical reactions, solvation processes, and the energy flow within and between molecules, and nanomaterials such as quantum dots. Experiments in chemical physics typically involve using spectroscopic methods to understand hydrogen bonding, electron transfer, the formation and dissolution of chemical bonds, chemical reactions, and the formation of nanoparticles.

The research objectives in the theoretical aspect of chemical physics are to understand how chemical structures and reactions work at the quantum mechanical level. This field also aims to clarify how ions and radicals behave and react in the gas phase and to develop precise approximations that simplify the computation of the physics of chemical phenomena.

Chemical physicists are looking for answers to such questions as:

- Can we experimentally test quantum mechanical predictions of the vibrations and rotations of simple molecules? Or even those of complex molecules (such as proteins)?
- Can we develop more accurate methods for calculating the electronic structure and properties of molecules?
- Can we understand chemical reactions from first principles?
- Why do quantum dots start blinking (in a pattern suggesting fractal kinetics) after absorbing photons?
- How do chemical reactions really take place?
- What is the step-by-step process that occurs when an isolated molecule becomes solvated? Or when a whole ensemble of molecules becomes solvated?
- Can we use the properties of negative ions to determine molecular structures, understand the dynamics of chemical reactions, or explain photodissociation?
- Why does a stream of soft x-rays knock enough electrons out of the atoms in a xenon cluster to cause the cluster to explode?

== Journals ==
- The Journal of Chemical Physics
- Journal of Physical Chemistry Letters
- Journal of Physical Chemistry A
- Journal of Physical Chemistry B
- Journal of Physical Chemistry C
- Physical Chemistry Chemical Physics
- Chemical Physics Letters
- Chemical Physics
- ChemPhysChem
- Molecular Physics (journal)

== See also ==
- Intermolecular force
- Molecular dynamics
- Quantum chemistry
- Solid-state physics or Condensed matter physics
- Surface science
- Van der Waals molecule
