= The Journal of Physical Chemistry C =

American academic journal

- Discipline: Physical Chemistry
- Language: English
- Edited by: Joan-Emma Shea

Publication details
- History: 1896–present
- Publisher: American Chemical Society (U.S.A)
- Frequency: Weekly
- Impact factor: 3.3 (2023)

Standard abbreviations
- ISO 4: J. Phys. Chem. C

Indexing
- CODEN: JPCCCK
- ISSN: 1932-7447 (print); 1932-7455 (web)

Links
- Journal homepage

The Journal of Physical Chemistry C publishes scientific articles reporting research on several subdisciplines of physical chemistry:

- Nanoparticles and nanostructures
- surfaces, interfaces, and catalysis
- Electron transport, optical and electronic devices
- Energy conversion and storage

It was created in 2007 when The Journal of Physical Chemistry B was split in two, largely due to the recent growth in the area of nanotechnology. The journal is published weekly, with the first issue on January 11, 2007. Like The Journal of Physical Chemistry A and B, it is published by the American Chemical Society.

The journal is indexed in: Chemical Abstracts Service (CAS) and British Library. According to the Journal Citation Reports, the journal had a 2022 impact factor of 3.7.

== Editor-in-Chief ==
- 2007–2019 George C. Schatz
- 2020–present Joan-Emma Shea

== See also ==
- The Journal of Physical Chemistry A
- The Journal of Physical Chemistry B
- The Journal of Physical Chemistry Letters
- Russian Journal of Physical Chemistry A
- Russian Journal of Physical Chemistry B
- Annual Review of Physical Chemistry
