= Joel Bowman =

American chemist (born 1948)

Joel M. Bowman
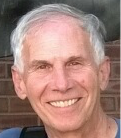
- Born: January 16, 1948 (age 78)
- Education: University of Massachusetts, Amherst; University of California, Berkeley; California Institute of Technology
- Scientific career
- Institutions: Emory University
- Doctoral advisor: Aron Kuppermann

Joel Mark Bowman is an American physical chemist and educator. He is an emeritus professor at Emory University.

== Education and career ==
Bowman spent his early years in Boston, Massachusetts, attending school in Dorchester and then moving to Brookline. He first attended University of Massachusetts-Amherst and then transferred to the University of California, Berkeley, where he received a bachelor’s degree in 1969. He went to California Institute of Technology for graduate school, and was advised by Donald Truhlar (as he was leaving for the University of Minnesota) to choose Aaron Kuppermann as his advisor. Completing his Ph.D. in 1974, he began his career at Illinois Institute of Technology in Chicago, where he began collaborating with Al Wagner at Argonne National Laboratory. He held a faculty appointment at Argonne from 1978 to 1991. In 1982-1983 he spent a sabbatical at the James Franck Institute of the University of Chicago, and worked as a consultant at Bell Laboratories in 1984. Bowman moved to Emory University in 1986, where he has spent the rest of his career to date.

== Research interests ==
Bowman's research interests are in basic theories of chemical reactivity. He is well known for his contributions in simulating potential energy surfaces for polyatomic molecules and clusters. Approximately fifty potential energy surfaces for molecules and clusters have been simulated employing his permutationally invariant polynomial method.

=== Permutationally invariant polynomial (PIP) method ===
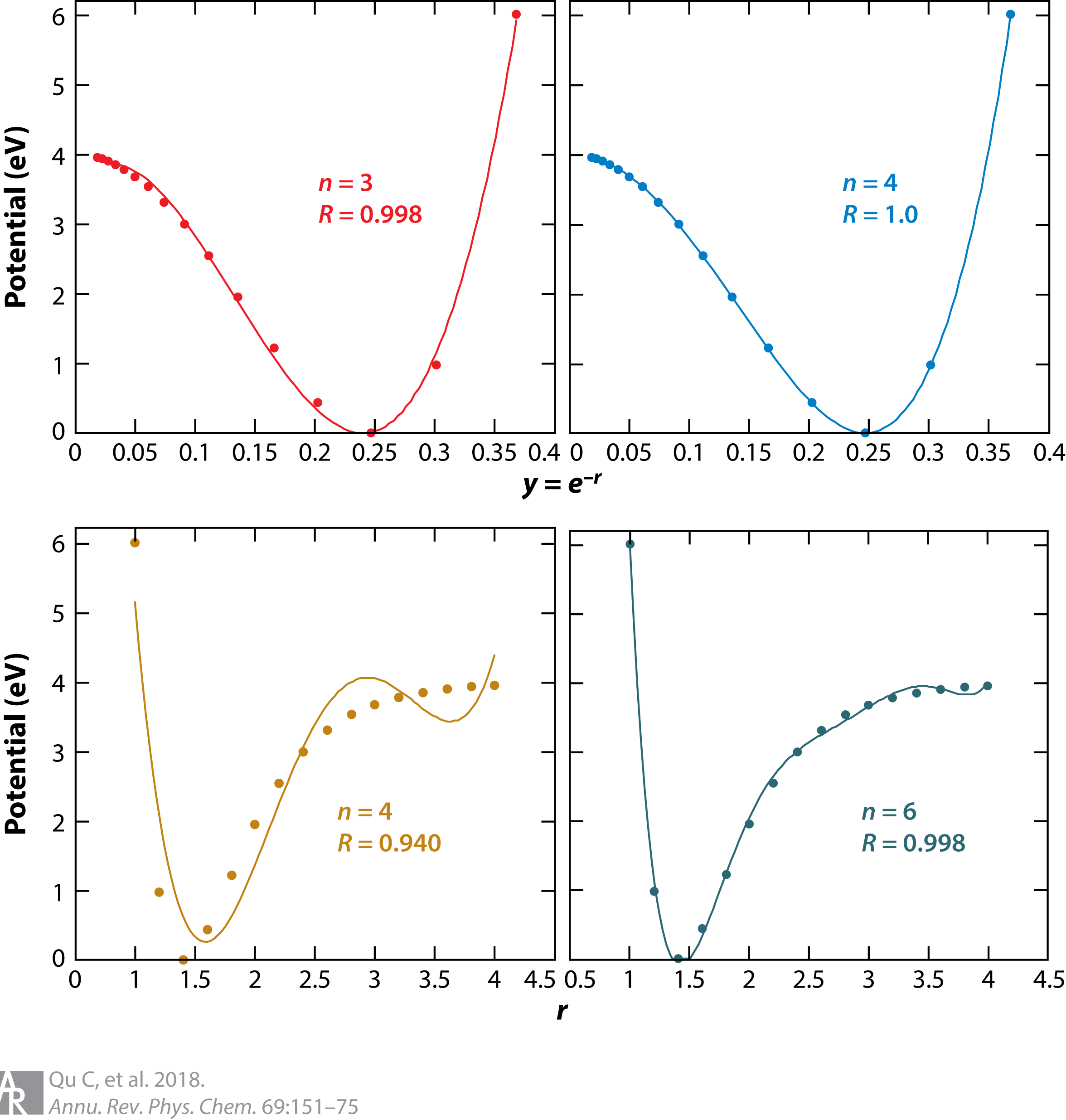
Linear least-squares polynomial fits of indicated order n and r-value in the variables r and y to a Morse potential.

Simulating potential energy surfaces (PESs) for reactive and non-reactive systems is of broad utility in theoretical and computational chemistry. Development of global PESs, or surfaces spanning a broad range of nuclear coordinates, is particularly necessary for certain applications, including molecular dynamics and Monte Carlo simulations and quantum reactive scattering calculations.

Rather than utilizing all of the internuclear distances, theoretical chemists often analytical equations for PESs by using a set of internal coordinates. For systems containing more than four atoms, the count of internuclear distances deviates from the equation 3N−6 (which represents the degrees of freedom in a three-dimensional space for a nonlinear molecule with N atoms). As an example, Collins and his team developed a method employing different sets of 3N−6 internal coordinates, which they applied to analyze the H + CH_{4} reaction. They addressed permutational symmetry by replicating data for permutations of the H atoms. In contrast to this approach, the PIP method uses the linear least-square method to accurately match tens of thousands of electronic energies for both reactive and non-reactive systems mathematically.

==== Methodology ====
Generally, the functions used in fitting potential energy surfaces to experimental and/or electronic structure theory data are based on the choice of coordinates. Most of the chosen coordinates are bond stretches, valence and dihedral angles, or other curvilinear coordinates such as the Jacobi coordinates or polyspherical coordinates. There are advantages to each of these choices. In the PIP approach, the N(N − 1)/2 internuclear distances are utilized. This number of variables is equal to 3N −6 (or 3N − 5 = 1 for diatomic molecules) for N = 3, 4 and differs for N ≥ 5. Thus, N = 5 is an important boundary that affects the choice of coordinates. An advantage of employing this variable set is its inherent closure under all permutations of atoms. This implies that regardless of the order in which atoms are permuted, the resulting set of variables remains unchanged. However, the main focus pertains to permutations involving identical atoms, as the PES must be invariant under such transformations.

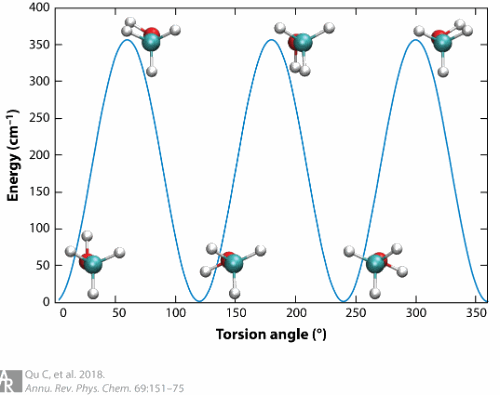
Potential energy curve of the internal rotation of CH_{3}OH from a full-dimensional, permutationally invariant potential energy surface

PIP utilizing Morse variables of the form $y_{ij}=exp(-r_{ij}/a)$, where $r_{ij}$ is the distance between atoms $i$ and $j$ and $a$ is a range parameter) offers a method for mathematically characterizing high-dimensional PESs. By fixing the range parameter in the Morse variable, the PES can be determined through linear least-squares fitting of computed electronic energies for the system at various structural arrangements. The adoption of a permutationally invariant fitting basis, whether in the form of all internuclear distances or transformed variables like Morse variables, facilitates the attainment of accurate fits for molecules and clusters.

== Publications, honors and awards ==
Bowman, who is the Samuel Candler Dobbs Professor Emeritus of Theoretical Chemistry at Emory University, is the author or co-author of more than 700 publications. He is an elected member of the International Academy of Quantum Molecular Sciences. He received the Herschbach Medal, which is the highest award given by the Conference on Molecular Collision Dynamics. He is an honorary fellow of the Chinese Chemical Society and an elected fellow of the American Physical Society and of the American Association for the Advancement of Science. In 2013, a Festschrift issue of the Journal of Physical Chemistry A was published in his honor.. He is also the recipient of the Alexander von Humboldt Research Award.

== Selected publications ==
- Bowman, J. M. (2000), "Beyond Platonic Molecules (An Invited "Perspective")", Science, 290 (5492): 724–725, doi:10.1126/science.290.5492.724, PMID 11184203, S2CID 93762491.
- Townsend, D.; Lahankar, S. A.; Lee, S. K.; Chambreau, S. D.; Suits, A. G.; Zhang, X.; Rheinecker, J.; Harding, L. B.; Bowman, J. M. (2004), "The roaming atom: Straying from the reaction path in formaldehyde decomposition", Science, 306 (5699): 1158–61, Bibcode:2004Sci...306.1158T, doi:10.1126/science.1104386, PMID 15498970, S2CID 31464376.
- Huang, X.; McCoy, A. B.; Bowman, J. M.; Johnson, L. M.; Savage, C.; Dong, F.; Nesbitt, D. J. (2006), "Quantum deconstruction of the infrared spectrum of CH_{5}^{+}", Science, 311 (5757): 60–3, Bibcode:2006Sci...311...60H, doi:10.1126/science.1121166, PMID 16400143, S2CID 26158108.
- Yin, H. M.; Kable, S. H.; Zhang, X.; Bowman, J. M. (2006), "Signatures of H_{2}CO Photodissociation from two electronic states", Science, 311 (5766): 1443–6, Bibcode:2006Sci...311.1443Y, doi:10.1126/science.1123397, PMID 16527976, S2CID 37885013.
- Vibrational Dynamics of Molecules, World Scientific Publishing, 2022.
