= The Journal of Chemical Physics =

- Discipline: Chemical physics
- Language: English
- Edited by: Tianquan (Tim) Lian

Publication details
- History: 1933–present
- Publisher: American Institute of Physics (United States)
- Frequency: weekly
- Impact factor: 3.7 (2025)

Standard abbreviations
- ISO 4: J. Chem. Phys.

Indexing
- CODEN: JCPSA6
- ISSN: 0021-9606 (print); 1089-7690 (web)

Links
- Journal homepage; Online access

The Journal of Chemical Physics is a scientific journal published by the American Institute of Physics that carries research papers on chemical physics. Two volumes, each of 24 issues, are published annually. It was established in 1933 when Journal of Physical Chemistry editors refused to publish theoretical works.

The editors have been:

- 2019–present: Tim Lian
- 2008–2018: Marsha I. Lester
- 2007–2008: Branka M. Ladanyi
- 1998–2007: Donald H. Levy
- 1983–1997: John C. Light
- 1960–1982: J. Willard Stout
- 1958–1959: Clyde A. Hutchison Jr.
- 1956–1957 (Acting): Joseph Edward Mayer
- 1953–1955: Clyde A. Hutchison Jr.
- 1942–1952: Joseph E. Mayer
- 1933–1941: Harold Urey

== Highlights ==
According to the Web of Science database, as to 15 March 2018, a total of 132,435 articles have been published in the Journal of Chemical Physics. The number of articles published per year was about 180 in the 1930s and decreased to about 120 during second world war. After the war the number of articles increased steadily, reaching about 1800 articles per year in 1970. The publishing rate remained fairly stable at this level until about 1990, when it climbed up again, reaching a maximum of 2871 articles published in 2014. It has since decreased somewhat to 2300 articles per year in the period 2015–2017.

As to 15 March 2018 and according to Web of Science, the ten most cited articles published in the Journal of Chemical Physics are:

1. A. D. Becke, Density Functional Thermochemistry. 3. The role of exact exchange, 98(7), 5648–5652 (1993) [65911 citations]
2. N. Metropolis, A. W. Rosenbluth, M. N. Rosenbluth, Equation of state calculations by fast computing machines, 21(6), 1087–1092 (1953) [19444 citations]
3. W. L. Jorgensen, J. Chandrasekhar, J. D. Madura et al., Comparison of simple potential functions for simulating liquid water, 79(2), 926–935 (1983) [19397 citations]
4. T. H. Dunning, Gaussian basis sets for use in correlated molecular calculations. 1. The atoms boron through neon and hydrogen, 90(2), 1007–2013 (1989), [18999 citations]
5. H. J. C. Berendsen, J. P. M. Postma, W. F. Van Gunsteren et al., Molecular dynamics with coupling to an external bath, 81(8), 3684–3690 (1984), [15826 citations]
6. T. Darden, D. York, J. Pedersen, Particle mesh Ewald – An N log(N) method for Ewald sums in large systems, 98(12), 10089–10092 (1993) [11591 citations]
7. P. J. Hay, W. R. Wadt, Ab initio effective core potentials for molecular calculations - Potentials for K to Au including the outermost core orbitals, 82(1), 299–310 (1985), [11195 citations]
8. R. F. Stewart, E. R. Davidson, W. T. Simpson, Coherent X-ray scattering for hydrogen atom in hydrogen molecule, 42(9), 3175 (1965) [10346 citations]
9. W. J. Hehre, R. Ditchfield, J. A. Pople, Self-consistent molecular-orbital methods. 12. Further extensions of Gaussian-type basis sets for use in molecular-orbital studies of organic molecules, 56(5), 2257 (1972) [10279 citations]
10. R. Krishnan, J. S. Binkley, R. Seeger et al., Self-consistent molecular-orbital methods. 20. Basis set for correlated wave-functions, 72(1), 650–654 (1980) [9558 citations]

== See also ==
- Annual Review of Physical Chemistry
- Russian Journal of Physical Chemistry A
- Russian Journal of Physical Chemistry B
