= Marshall Fixman =

American chemist

- Born: September 21, 1930; St. Louis, Missouri
- Died: February 27, 2016 (aged 85); Loveland, Colorado
- Education: Washington University in St. Louis; Massachusetts Institute of Technology
- Scientific career
- Fields: Physical Chemistry
- Workplaces: University of Oregon; Yale University; Colorado State University
- Doctoral students: Kenneth B. Eisenthal

Marshall Fixman (September 21, 1930 - February 27, 2016) was an American physical chemist.

Fixman earned his undergraduate degree in 1950 from Washington University in St. Louis, and his Ph.D. from the Massachusetts Institute of Technology in 1954.

Fixman was elected a Fellow of the American Physical Society in 1962 while working at the University of Oregon. For his research—theoretical and computational studies of the physical chemistry of polymers—Fixman was elected to the National Academy of Sciences in 1973.

Fixman held an endowed professorship at Yale University but moved to Colorado State University in 1979 with his wife, Branka Ladanyi, who also joined CSU's chemistry faculty. He was an associate editor of the Journal of Chemical Physics, and received the American Chemical Society's awards in pure chemistry (1964) and polymer chemistry (1991).
