= Nasim Łuczaj =

Polish translator and poet

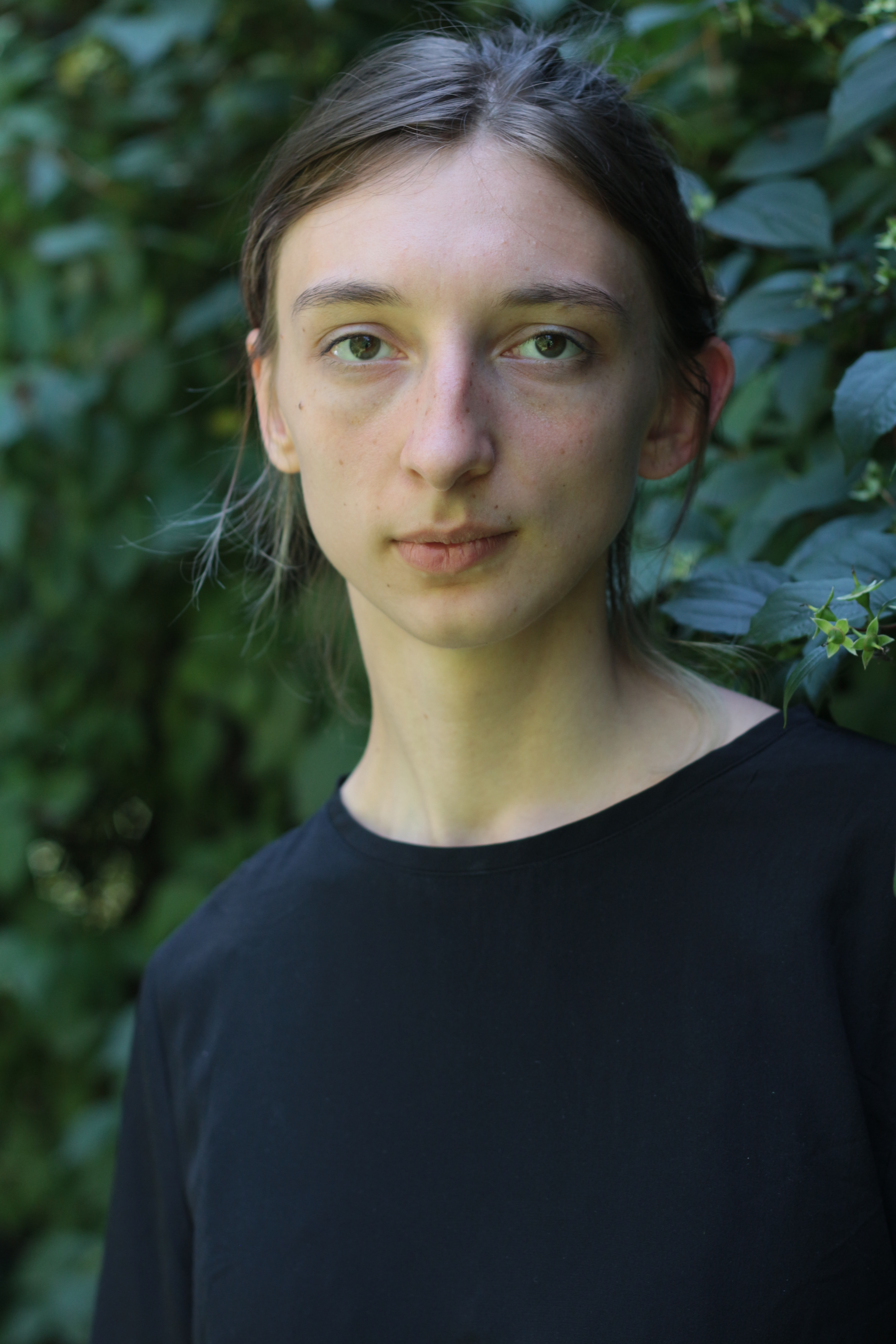
- Nasim Łuczaj in 2022
- Citizenship: Polish
- Education: University of Glasgow, Goldsmiths, University of London
- Occupations: Poet, translator, model
- Website: nasimluczaj.com

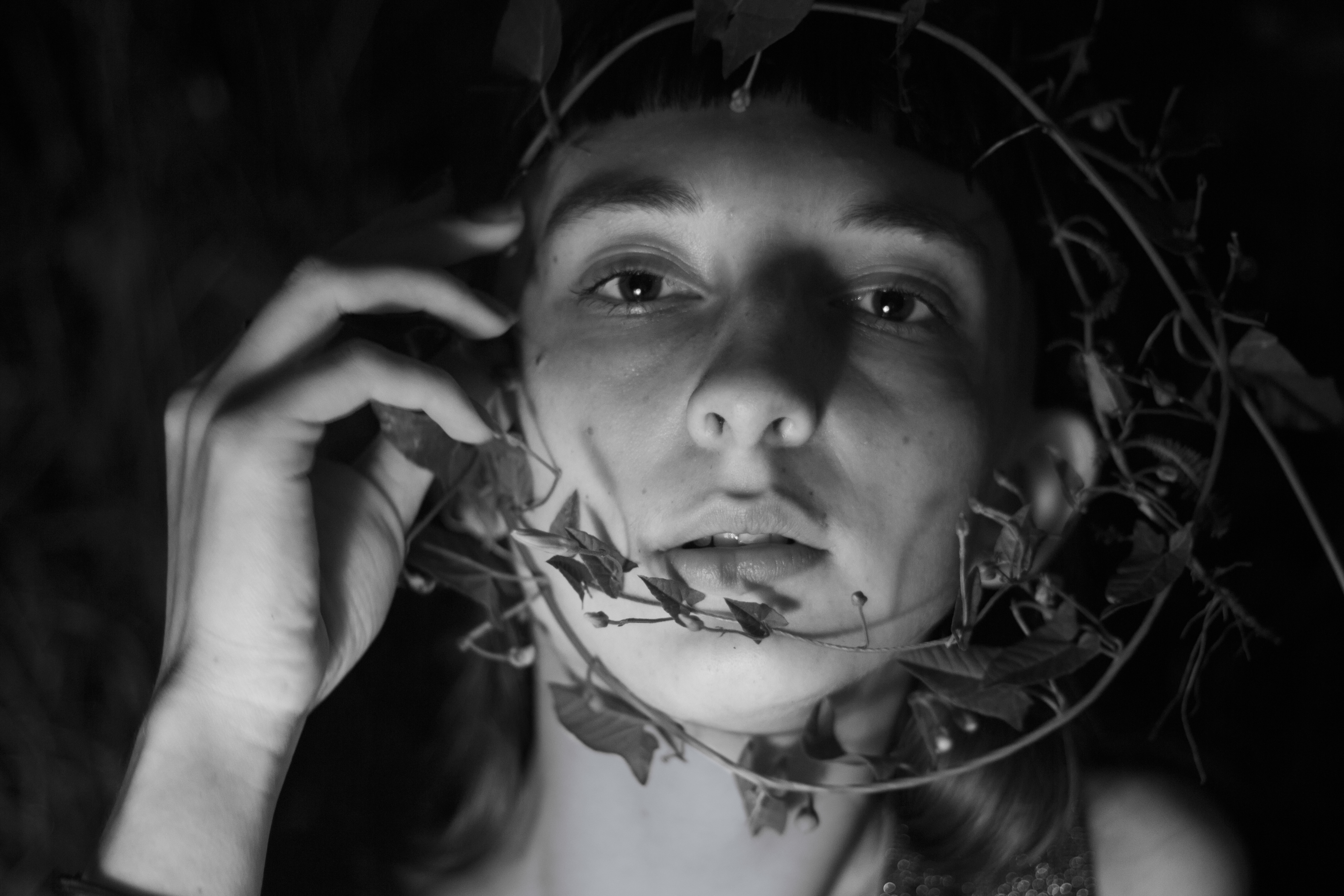
Nasim Łuczaj, 2019

Nasim Łuczaj is a poet and Polish—English translator based between London, Glasgow and Pietrusza Wola in the Carpathians.

== Biography ==
The daughter of Sarah and Łukasz Łuczaj, she co-authored a paper “Wild food plants and fungi used in the mycophilous Tibetan community of Zhagana (Tewo County, Gansu, China)”, published in 2016 in the Journal of Ethnobiology and Ethnomedicine. She starred in a short film T. Rickster directed by her aunt, Justyna Łuczaj, in 2007. She attended the Mikołaj Kopernik High School in Krosno (becoming a finalist in the national Olympics in Polish Language and Literature) and graduated from the University of Glasgow and Emerging Translator Mentorship of the National Centre for Writing. She studied for an MA in creative and life writing at Goldsmiths, University of London.

She authored Hind Mouth (Earthbound Poetry Series) and was the winner of the 2024 Queen Mary Wasafiri New Writing Prize for the village. She was a finalist of the Aesthetica Creative Writing Award and the Alpine Fellowship. Her work has been included in the anthologies PROTOTYPE 5 (Prototype), the weird folds: everyday poems from the anthropocene (Dostoyevsky Wannabe), and Virtual Oasis: An Anthology of Human–AI Responses (Trickhouse Press). She published translations of contemporary Polish poetry in The Atlanta Review. She was a language consultant to the film Głos (2023) and translated subtitles to the film Koński ogon (2024). In 2025 she obtained the Wisława Szymborska Foundation residency and the Cove Park residency.
