= Kenneth B. Eisenthal =

American physical chemist (1933–2024)

Kenneth B. Eisenthal (March 23, 1933 – March 3, 2024) was an American physical chemist.

== Life and career ==
Eisenthal was born in New York City on March 23, 1933. He received a B.S. in chemistry from Brooklyn College. He graduated from Harvard University with an M.A. in physics and a Ph.D. in chemical physics. His doctoral thesis supervisor was Marshall Fixman. As a postdoc, Eisenthal worked at UCLA (University of California, Los Angeles), where he gained experience in molecular spectroscopy in the research group of Mostafa El-Sayed. After his stay at UCLA, Eisenthal briefly worked at The Aerospace Corporation and then at the IBM Almaden Research Center, where he did research in the Chemical Physics Group. The application of lasers in chemistry (laser chemistry) became his main field of work. The development of the picosecond laser in the late 1960s created new possibilities for measuring molecular relaxation processes. Eisenthal made important contributions to the then new field of picosecond-laser spectroscopy. In 1975 he moved to Columbia University, as the holder of a professorship ("Mark Hyman Professor of Chemistry"). At Columbia University he did fundamental research on free electrons in water, the photochemistry of carbenes, and other photochemical processes (photoisomerization), before his research activities focused on the application of lasers to investigation of the equilibrium and dynamic properties of molecules at liquid interfaces and at solid interfaces.

Eisenthal was the author or co-author of more than 200 scientific articles. His co-authors include Nicholas Turro. Eisenthal was a Guggenheim Fellow for the academic year 1984–1985. In 1986 he was elected a fellow of the American Physical Society. He received in 1998 the ACS Award in Surface Chemistry from the American Chemical Society, in 2016 the Joel Henry Hildebrand Award, and in 2014 the ACS Award in Colloid Chemistry. In 2000 he was elected a member of the National Academy of Sciences.

Eisenthal died on March 3, 2024, at the age of 90.

== Selected publications ==
- Eisenthal, K. B.; El-Sayed, M. A. (1965). "Heavy-atom effects on radiative and radiationless processes in charge-transfer complexes". Journal of Chemical Physics. 42 (2): 794–796. Bibcode:1965JChPh..42..794E. doi:10.1063/1.1696013.
- Auston, D. H.; Eisenthal, K. B., eds. (1984). Ultrafast Phenomena IV. Springer Series in Chemical Physics. Vol. 38. Berlin, Heidelberg, New York, Tokyo: Springer. doi:10.1007/978-3-642-82378-7. ISBN 978-3-642-82380-0.
- Eisenthal, K. B. (1992). "Equilibrium and dynamic processes at interfaces by second harmonic and sum frequency generation". Annual Review of Physical Chemistry. 43: 627–661. Bibcode:1992ARPC...43..627E. doi:10.1146/annurev.pc.43.100192.003211.
- Araya, R.; Jiang, J.; Eisenthal, K. B.; Yuste, R. (2006). "The spine neck filters membrane potentials". Proceedings of the National Academy of Sciences. 103 (47): 17961–17966. Bibcode:2006PNAS..10317961A. doi:10.1073/pnas.0608755103. ISSN 0027-8424. PMC 1693855. PMID 17093040.
- Araya, R.; Nikolenko, V.; Eisenthal, K. B.; Yuste, R. (2007). "Sodium channels amplify spine potentials". Proceedings of the National Academy of Sciences. 104 (30): 12347–12352. Bibcode:2007PNAS..10412347A. doi:10.1073/pnas.0705282104. ISSN 0027-8424. PMC 1924793. PMID 17640908.
- Rao, Y.; Kwok, S. J. J.; Lombardi, J.; Turro, N. J.; Eisenthal, K. B. (2014). "Label-free probe of HIV-1 TAT peptide binding to mimetic membranes". Proceedings of the National Academy of Sciences. 111 (35): 12684–12688. Bibcode:2014PNAS..11112684R. doi:10.1073/pnas.1411817111. ISSN 0027-8424. PMC 4156756. PMID 25136100.
