= George C. Schatz =

American theoretical chemist

George Chappell Schatz
- Born: April 14, 1949 (age 77)
- Education: Clarkson University
- Alma mater: California Institute of Technology
- Awards: Feynman Prize in Nanotechnology (2008); Peter Debye Award (2010); Irving Langmuir Award (2016)
- Scientific career
- Fields: reaction dynamics
- Workplaces: Northwestern University
- Doctoral advisor: Aron Kuppermann

George Chappell Schatz (born April 14, 1949), the Morrison Professor of Chemistry at Northwestern University, is a theoretical chemist best known for his seminal contributions to the fields of reaction dynamics and nanotechnology.

== Early life and career ==
Born in Watertown, New York and raised in Sackets Harbor, New York, he obtained his B. S. in chemistry from Clarkson University in 1971. At Clarkson, he was mentored by organic chemistry professor Richard Partsch, who encouraged him to spend a summer working at Argonne National Laboratory in 1971. He went on to earn a Ph.D. from Caltech in 1976 under Aron Kuppermann. While working on his doctorate, he took classes taught by Richard Feynman on quantum electrodynamics and particle physics. Following postdoctoral work at MIT under John Ross, he joined the chemistry department at Northwestern University. Schatz is a member of the Center for Chemistry at the Space-Time Limit.

To date he has co-authored over 1000 scientific papers and co-authored two books with his colleague Mark A. Ratner: Introduction to Quantum Mechanics in Chemistry and Quantum Mechanics in Chemistry. Recently much of Schatz's research has been concerned with nanotechnology and bionanotechnology. His work has collectively received over 130,000 citations, including a 2003 article on the optical properties of nanoparticles which has been cited more than 12,000 times.

A longtime senior editor of the Journal of Physical Chemistry, he became its editor-in-chief in 2005. The journal previously (1997) having been split in Journal of Physical Chemistry A (molecular physical chemistry, both theoretical and experimental) and Journal of Physical Chemistry B (solid state, soft matter, liquids), Schatz initiated the spin-off of a third journal, Journal of Physical Chemistry C, focusing on nanotechnology and molecular electronics.

== Awards and honors ==
Schatz is a Fellow of the American Physical Society (1987) and a member of the National Academy of Sciences (2007) and the International Academy of Quantum Molecular Science. Schatz has won the Ahmed Zewail Prize award of the journal Chemical Physics Letters for "outstanding contributions to the theory and understanding of gas-phase reaction dynamics, plasmonics, and nanostructured materials". The biennial prize was developed by Elsevier to honor Nobel laureate Ahmed Zewail, who was a longtime editor of the journal.
