= Ethnographic Museum of Kraków =

Coordinates: 50.048535°N 19.94356°E

Seweryn Udziela Ethnographic Museum of Kraków
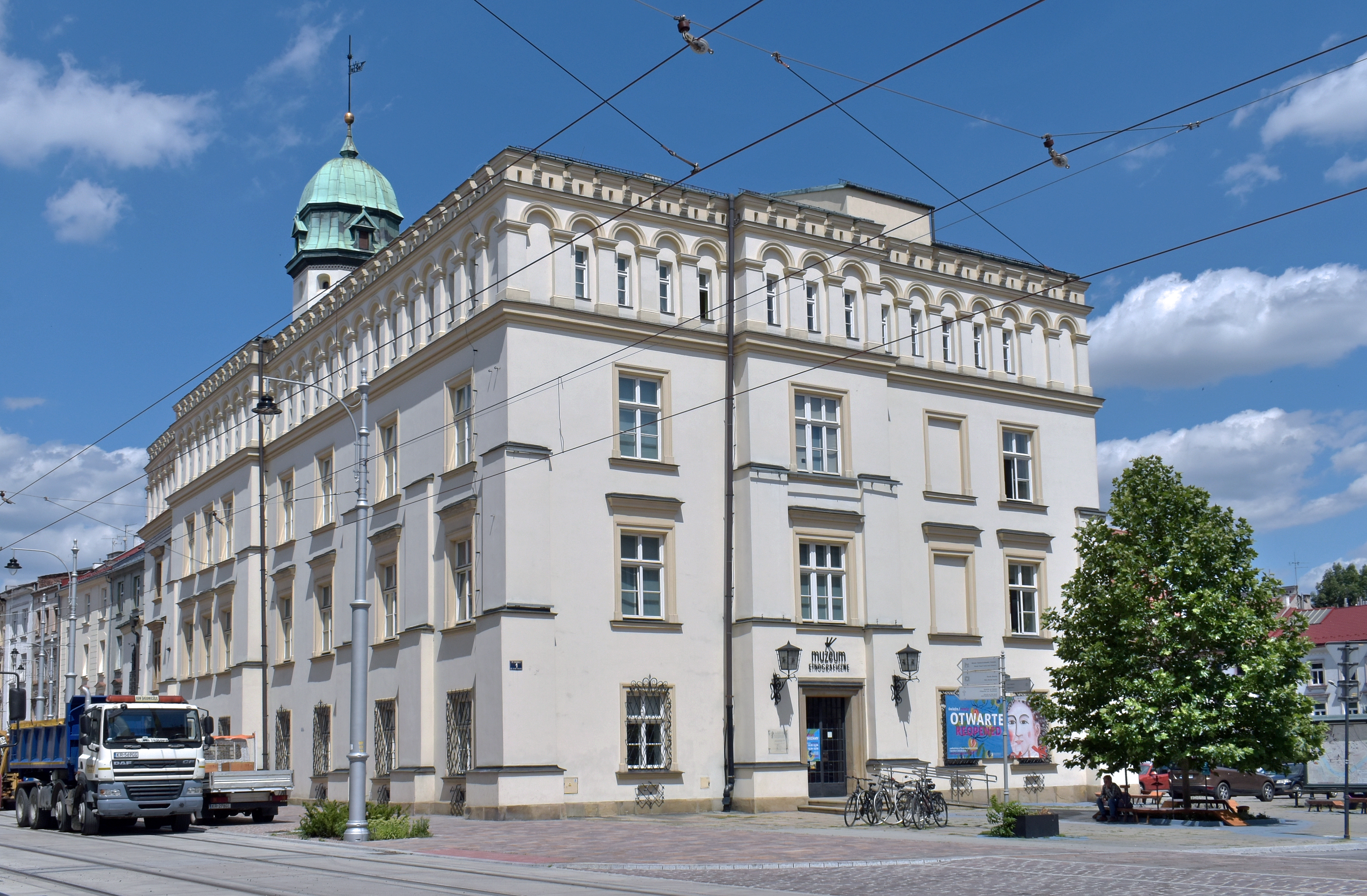
- Established: 1902
- Location: pl. Wolnica 1, Kazimierz, Kraków, Poland
- Type: Ethnographic museum
- Director: Antoni Bartosz

The Seweryn Udziela Ethnographic Museum of Kraków (Polish: Muzeum Etnograficzne im. Seweryna Udzieli w Krakowie) is a museum in Kazimierz, Kraków, Poland. It was established in 1902.

== History ==
The plans for the establishment of the Ethnographic Museum began in 1902 and were related to the exhibition on folk art from the collection of Seweryn Udziela, organized by the Polish Applied Arts Society. The National Museum in 1904 created an ethnographic department and a permanent ethnographic exposition in the Cloth Hall was opened. There were collections of, among others, Seweryn Udziela, Stanisław Witkiewicz, and Tadeusz Estreicher.

In 1910, the Society of the Ethnographic Museum was founded, which took over the collection from the National Museum. In 1911 a separate branch was established at Studencka St., with Seweryn Udziela as its director. A year later, the collections were exported to Wawel. After World War II, the seat of the Ethnographic Museum changed its place to Plac Wolnica 1, and after some time also to 46 Krakowska Street. The main building is the former Town Hall of Kazimierski. The collection numbers over 80,000 monuments and is associated with Polish culture (folklore, art, everyday life ...) as well as with other cultures of Europe and the world.

== Legal status and organizational structure of the museum ==
=== The museum operates on the basis of the Act on Museums ===
- [1], the Act on Organizing and Conducting Cultural Activity
- [2] and the Statute of the Ethnographic Museum. Tailors grants in Kraków, granted by Resolution No. 491/2000 of the Board of the Lesser Poland Voivodship of November 9, 2000
- [3]. According to the statute, the museum is a self-governing institution of culture, separated in legal, organizational and economic-financial terms, organized by the Self-Government of the Lesser Poland Voivodeship.

The structure of the Ethnographic Museum Seweryn Udziela in Kraków form Museum Departments:

- 1. Material Culture Department
- 2.Two Fabrics and Fabrics
- 3.Editorial Culture Village
- 4. Art Department
- 5.Culture of European People's Cultures
- 6.Culture of Non-European Folk Cultures
- 7.Inventory and Collection Department
- 8.Educational Section, Exhibitions and Publications
- 9. Documentation of People's Culture and Museum History
- 10. Collection Maintenance Department
- 11.Biblioteka
- 12. Department of Administration, Surveillance and Service
- 13. Accounting Department

At 46 Krakowska St. in the Esterka House, there is a branch of the museum.

Supervision over the museum is generally carried out by the Minister of Culture and National Heritage, and directly by the Board of the Małopolska Voivodship. The Museum Council operates at the museum, whose members are appointed by the Self-government of the Lesser Poland Voivodeship [3]. Internally, the museum's work rules are defined in the Organizational Regulations [4].

== Past exhibits ==
The 2013 Souvenir, Talisman, Toy exhibit, curated by Erica Lehrer, explored the development of Jewish figurines in general and the "Lucky Jew" in particular.

== 2025 public toilet controversy ==
In October 2025, Łukasz Łuczaj criticized Ethnographic Museum of Kraków for not providing access to the public toilet in the museum to him and two of his friends. In response, the museum accused Łuczaj of inspiring hate speech against the museum's worker.
