= Michael Kasha =

American biochemist (1920–2013)

- Born: December 6, 1920; Elizabeth, New Jersey, U.S.
- Died: June 12, 2013 (aged 92); Tallahassee, Florida, U.S.
- Citizenship: American
- Education: Cooper Union; University of California, Berkeley; University of Michigan
- Known for: Kasha's rule
- Scientific career
- Fields: physical chemistry, biophysics
- Doctoral advisor: Gilbert N. Lewis
- Doctoral students: Mostafa El-Sayed

Michael Kasha (December 6, 1920 – June 12, 2013) was an American physical chemist and molecular spectroscopist who was one of the original founders of the Institute of Molecular Biophysics at Florida State University.

== Education and early work ==
Born and raised in Elizabeth, New Jersey, to a family of Ukrainian immigrants, Kasha graduated in 1938 from Thomas Jefferson High School, where the yearbook listed him as one of two "class brains".

He studied chemical engineering at night at the Cooper Union in New York City for two years while working full-time during the days at the Merck & Co. research facility in New Jersey. He then received a full scholarship to the University of Michigan, where he completed a bachelor's degree in chemistry. He earned his Ph.D. in chemistry from University of California at Berkeley in 1945, working with renowned physical chemist G.N. Lewis. Following postdoctoral work with Robert Mulliken, he joined the chemistry department at Florida State University as a faculty member in 1951.

== Awards and honors ==
Kasha was named the Robert O. Lawton Distinguished University Research Professor at Florida State University in 1962, which is the university's highest honor. He was elected as a Fellow of the National Academy of Sciences in 1971, the first Floridian to be so honored. He was also a Fellow of the American Academy of Arts & Sciences (1963), as well as the International Academy of Quantum Molecular Science. He was an elected member of the Ukrainian SSR Academy of Sciences and the Brazilian Academy of Sciences, and received the Porter medal from the European Photochemistry Association (1990).

== Important contributions ==
The research in his molecular spectroscopy laboratory focused on the discovery and elucidation of excitation mechanisms, with particular application to photochemical and biophysical problems. His most important achievements include identifying triplet states as source of phosphorescence emission, formulating the Kasha rule on fluorescence, and his work on singlet molecular oxygen.

Kasha is also known for his interest in improving the sound quality and durability of the acoustic guitar and the classic string instruments. A 30-year collaboration with luthier Richard Schneider led to a series of innovative changes to the traditional classical guitar. His guitar design was patented and is known as the "Kasha guitar".

== Literature ==
- R. Hochstrasser, J. Saltiel. Research Career of Michael Kasha. J. Phys. Chem. A, 2003, 107 (18), pp 3161–3162
- Michael Kasha - Editorial, Biographical Sketch, Summary of Research Contributions, Research Associates, and Publications list J . Phys. Chem., 1991, 95 (25), pp 10215–10220
