= Minnesota functionals =

DFT methods developed by Donald Truhlar's research group

Minnesota Functionals (Myz) are a group of highly parameterized approximate exchange-correlation energy functionals in density functional theory (DFT). They are developed by the group of Donald Truhlar at the University of Minnesota. The Minnesota functionals are available in a large number of popular quantum chemistry computer programs, and can be used for traditional quantum chemistry and solid-state physics calculations.

These functionals are based on the meta-GGA approximation, i.e. they include terms that depend on the kinetic energy density, and are all based on complicated functional forms parametrized on high-quality benchmark databases. The Myz functionals are widely used and tested in the quantum chemistry community.

== Controversies ==
Independent evaluations of the strengths and limitations of the Minnesota functionals with respect to various chemical properties cast doubts on their accuracy. Some regard this criticism to be unfair. In this view, because Minnesota functionals are aiming for a balanced description for both main-group and transition-metal chemistry, the studies assessing Minnesota functionals solely based on the performance on main-group databases yield biased information, as the functionals that work well for main-group chemistry may fail for transition metal chemistry.

A study in 2017 highlighted what appeared to be the poor performance of Minnesota functionals on atomic densities. Others subsequently refuted this criticism, claiming that focusing only on atomic densities (including chemically unimportant, highly charged cations) is hardly relevant to real applications of density functional theory in computational chemistry. Another study found this to be the case: for Minnesota functionals, the errors in atomic densities and in energetics are indeed decoupled, and the Minnesota functionals perform better for diatomic densities than for the atomic densities. The study concludes that atomic densities do not yield an accurate judgement of the performance of density functionals. Minnesota functionals have also been shown to reproduce chemically relevant Fukui functions better than they do the atomic densities.

== Family of functionals ==
=== Minnesota 05 ===
The first family of Minnesota functionals, published in 2005, is composed by:

- M05: Global hybrid functional with 28% HF exchange.
- M05-2X Global hybrid functional with 56% HF exchange.

In addition to the fraction of HF exchange, the M05 family of functionals includes 22 additional empirical parameters. A range-separated functional based on the M05 form, ωM05-D which includes empirical atomic dispersion corrections, has been reported by Chai and coworkers.

=== Minnesota 06 ===
The '06 family represent a general improvement over the 05 family and is composed of:

- M06-L: Local functional, 0% HF exchange. Intended to be fast, good for transition metals, inorganic and organometallics.
- revM06-L: Local functional, 0% HF exchange. M06-L revised for smoother potential energy curves and improved overall accuracy.
- M06: Global hybrid functional with 27% HF exchange. Intended for main group thermochemistry and non-covalent interactions, transition metal thermochemistry and organometallics. It is usually the most versatile of the 06 functionals, and because of this large applicability it can be slightly worse than M06-2X for specific properties that require high percentage of HF exchange, such as thermochemistry and kinetics.
- revM06: Global hybrid functional with 40.4% HF exchange. Intended for a broad range of applications on main-group chemistry, transition-metal chemistry, and molecular structure prediction to replace M06 and M06-2X.
- M06-2X: Global hybrid functional with 54% HF exchange. It is the top performer within the 06 functionals for main group thermochemistry, kinetics and non-covalent interactions, however it cannot be used for cases where multi-reference species are or might be involved, such as transition metal thermochemistry and organometallics.
- M06-HF: Global hybrid functional with 100% HF exchange. Intended for charge transfer TD-DFT and systems where self-interaction is pathological.

The M06 and M06-2X functionals introduce 35 and 32 empirically optimized parameters, respectively, into the exchange-correlation functional. A range-separated functional based on the M06 form, ωM06-D3 which includes empirical atomic dispersion corrections, has been reported by Chai and coworkers.

=== Minnesota 08 ===
The '08 family was created with the primary intent to improve the M06-2X functional form, retaining the performances for main group thermochemistry, kinetics and non-covalent interactions. This family is composed by two functionals with a high percentage of HF exchange, with performances similar to those of M06-2X:

- M08-HX: Global hybrid functional with 52.23% HF exchange. Intended for main group thermochemistry, kinetics and non-covalent interactions.
- M08-SO: Global hybrid functional with 56.79% HF exchange. Intended for main group thermochemistry, kinetics and non-covalent interactions.

=== Minnesota 11 ===
The '11 family introduces range-separation in the Minnesota functionals and modifications in the functional form and in the training databases. These modifications also cut the number of functionals in a complete family from 4 (M06-L, M06, M06-2X and M06-HF) to just 2:

- M11-L: Local functional (0% HF exchange) with dual-range DFT exchange. Intended to be fast, to be good for transition metals, inorganic, organometallics and non-covalent interactions, and to improve much over M06-L.
- M11: Range-separated hybrid functional with 42.8% HF exchange in the short-range and 100% in the long-range. Intended for main group thermochemistry, kinetics and non-covalent interactions, with an intended performance comparable to that of M06-2X, and for TD-DFT applications, with an intended performance comparable to M06-HF.
- revM11: Range-separated hybrid functional with 22.5% HF exchange in the short-range and 100% in the long-range. Intended for good performance for electronic excitations and good predictions across the board for ground-state properties.

=== Minnesota 12 ===
The 12 family uses a nonseparable (N in MN) functional form aiming to provide balanced performance for both chemistry and solid-state physics applications. It is composed by:

- MN12-L: A local functional, 0% HF exchange. The aim of the functional was to be very versatile and provide good computational performance and accuracy for energetic and structural problems in both chemistry and solid-state physics.
- MN12-SX: Screened-exchange (SX) hybrid functional with 25% HF exchange in the short-range and 0% HF exchange in the long-range. MN12-L was intended to be very versatile and provide good performance for energetic and structural problems in both chemistry and solid-state physics, at a computational cost that is intermediate between local and global hybrid functionals.

=== Minnesota 15 ===
The 15 functionals are the newest addition to the Minnesota family. Like the 12 family, the functionals are based on a non-separable form, but unlike the 11 or 12 families the hybrid functional doesn't use range separation: MN15 is a global hybrid like in the pre-11 families. The 15 family consists of two functionals

- MN15, a global hybrid with 44% HF exchange.
- MN15-L, a local functional with 0% HF exchange.

== Main Software with Implementation of the Minnesota Functionals ==
| Package | M05 | M05-2X | M06-L | revM06-L | M06 | M06-2X | M06-HF | M08-HX | M08-SO | M11-L | M11 | MN12-L | MN12-SX | MN15 | MN15-L |
|---|---|---|---|---|---|---|---|---|---|---|---|---|---|---|---|
| ADF | Yes* | Yes* | Yes | No | Yes | Yes | Yes | Yes* | Yes* | Yes* | Yes* | Yes* | Yes* | Yes* | Yes* |
| CPMD | Yes | Yes | Yes | No | Yes | Yes | Yes | Yes | Yes | Yes | Yes | No | No | No | No |
| GAMESS (US) | Yes | Yes | Yes | No | Yes | Yes | Yes | Yes | Yes | Yes | Yes | Yes | Yes | Yes | Yes |
| Gaussian 16 | Yes | Yes | Yes | No | Yes | Yes | Yes | Yes | Yes | Yes | Yes | Yes | Yes | Yes | Yes |
| Jaguar | Yes | Yes | Yes | No | Yes | Yes | Yes | Yes | Yes | Yes | Yes | Yes | No | Yes | Yes |
| Libxc: Abinit; ADF; APE; Atomistix ToolKit; AtomPAW; BigDFT; Castep; CP2K; DP; Elk; ERKALE; exciting; GPAW; JDFTx; MOLGW; Octopus; Yambo | Yes | Yes | Yes | Yes | Yes | Yes | Yes | Yes | Yes | Yes | Yes | Yes | Yes | Yes | Yes |
| MOLCAS | Yes | Yes | Yes | No | Yes | Yes | Yes | Yes | Yes | No | No | No | No | No | No |
| MOLPRO | Yes | Yes | Yes | No | Yes | Yes | Yes | Yes | Yes | Yes | No | No | No | No | No |
| NWChem | Yes | Yes | Yes | No | Yes | Yes | Yes | Yes | Yes | Yes | Yes | No | No | No | No |
| Orca | Yes* | Yes* | Yes | Yes* | Yes | Yes | Yes* | Yes* | Yes* | Yes* | Yes* | Yes* | Yes* | Yes* | Yes* |
| PSI4 | Yes* | Yes* | Yes* | No | Yes* | Yes* | Yes* | Yes* | Yes* | Yes* | Yes* | Yes* | Yes* | Yes* | Yes* |
| Q-Chem: Spartan | Yes | Yes | Yes | Yes | Yes | Yes | Yes | Yes | Yes | Yes | Yes | Yes | Yes | No | Yes |
| Quantum ESPRESSO | No | No | Yes | No | No | No | No | No | No | No | No | No | No | No | No |
| TURBOMOLE: using XCFun | Yes* | Yes* | Yes | Yes* | Yes | Yes | Yes | Yes* | Yes* | Yes* | Yes* | Yes* | Yes* | Yes* | Yes* |
| VASP | No | No | Yes | No | No | No | No | No | No | No | No | No | No | No | No |

* Using LibXC.
