= Aron Kuppermann =

Brazilian chemist (1926–2011)

- Born: 6 May 1926; São Paulo, Brazil
- Died: 14 October 2011 (aged 85); Altadena, California
- Education: University of São Paulo; University of Notre Dame
- Scientific career
- Workplaces: Instituto Tecnológico de Aeronáutica; University of Illinois; California Institute of Technology
- Doctoral advisor: Milton Burton
- Doctoral students: George C. Schatz; Donald Truhlar; Joel Bowman

Aron Kuppermann (May 6, 1926 – October 14, 2011) was a professor of chemical physics at California Institute of Technology. The author of more than 200 publications, he is perhaps best known for his work in the application of quantum mechanics to the solution of problems in chemical reaction dynamics and kinetics. Kuppermann and George Schatz completed the first calculation of the dynamics of a chemical reaction in a full 3-dimensional quantum model.

Born in Brazil, Kuppermann earned degrees in Chemical Engineering (1948) and Civil Engineering (1952) from the University of São Paulo. He served as an assistant professor of chemistry at the Instituto Tecnológico de Aeronáutica in São José dos Campos (1950–51). He was a British Council Scholar at the University of Edinburgh, Scotland in 1953, and earned a Ph.D. in physical chemistry at the University of Notre Dame in 1955. He then joined the faculty of the University of Illinois (1955–1963) and subsequently came to California Institute of Technology in 1963.

== Awards and recognitions ==
Kuppermann received the Centennial of Science Award from Notre Dame in 1965. In 1967 he was the Venable Lecturer at the University of North Carolina, and in 1968 was named the Werner Lecturer at the University of Kansas. He was the Kolthoff Lecturer at the University of Minnesota in 1984. He was a John Simon Guggenheim Fellow at the Weizmann Institute and the University of São Paulo in 1976 and 1977.
