= Kasha's rule =

Law of photochemistry

Scheme of Kasha's rule. A photon with energy $h\nu_1$ excites an electron of fundamental level, of energy $E_0$, up to an excited energy level (e.g. $E_1$ or $E_2$) or on one of the vibrational sub-levels. Vibrational relaxation then takes place between excited levels, which leads to dissipation of part of the energy ($\Delta E_d$), taking the form of a transition (internal conversion) towards the lowest excited level. Energy is then dissipated by emission of a photon of energy $h\nu_2$, which allows the system to go back to its fundamental state.

Kasha's rule is a principle in the photochemistry of electronically excited molecules. The rule states that photon emission (fluorescence or phosphorescence) occurs in appreciable yield only from the lowest excited state of a given multiplicity. It is named after American spectroscopist Michael Kasha, who proposed it in 1950.

== Description and explanation ==
The rule is relevant in understanding the emission spectrum of an excited molecule. Upon absorbing a photon, a molecule in its electronic ground state (denoted S_{0}, assuming a singlet state) may – depending on the photon wavelength – be excited to any of a set of higher electronic states (denoted S_{n} where n>0). However, according to Kasha's rule, photon emission (termed fluorescence in the case of an S state) is expected in appreciable yield only from the lowest excited state, S_{1}. Since only one state is expected to yield emission, an equivalent statement of the rule is that the emission wavelength is independent of the excitation wavelength.

The rule can be explained by the Franck–Condon factors for vibronic transitions. For a given pair of energy levels that differ in both vibrational and electronic quantum numbers, the Franck–Condon factor expresses the degree of overlap between their vibrational wavefunctions. The greater the overlap, the more quickly the molecule can undergo a transition from the higher to the lower level. Overlap between pairs is greatest when the two vibrational levels are close in energy; this tends to be the case when the vibrationless levels of the electronic states coupled by the transition (where the vibrational quantum number v is zero) are close. In most molecules, the vibrationless levels of the excited states all lie close together, so molecules in upper states quickly reach the lowest excited state, S_{1}, before they have time to fluoresce. However, the energy gap between S_{1} and S_{0} is greater, so here fluorescence occurs, since it is now kinetically competitive with internal conversion (IC).

Exceptions to Kasha's rule arise when there are large energy gaps between excited states. An example is azulene: the classical explanation is that the S_{1} and S_{2} states lie sufficiently far apart that fluorescence is observed mostly from S_{2}. In 2023, an explanation was proposed which pointed out that the S_{1} excited state has antiaromatic character while the S_{2} excited state is aromatic.

== Vavilov rule ==
A corollary of Kasha's rule is the Vavilov rule, which states that the quantum yield of luminescence is generally independent of the excitation wavelength. This can be understood as a consequence of the tendency – implied by Kasha's rule – for molecules in upper states to relax to the lowest excited state non-radiatively. Again there are exceptions: for example benzene vapour.

== See also ==
- Stokes shift, the difference between the absorption and emission frequencies, related to Kasha's rule.
