= Astroecology =

Study of the interactions of biota with space environments

Astroecology concerns the interactions of biota with space environments. It studies resources for life on planets, asteroids and comets, around various stars, in galaxies, and in the universe. The results allow estimating the future prospects for life, from planetary to galactic and cosmological scales.

Available energy, and microgravity, radiation, pressure and temperature are physical factors that affect astroecology. The ways by which life can reach space environments, including natural panspermia and directed panspermia are also considered. Further, for human expansion in space and directed panspermia, motivation by life-centered biotic ethics, panbiotic ethics and planetary bioethics are also relevant.

== Overview ==
The term "astroecology" was first applied in the context of performing studies in actual meteorites to evaluate their potential resources favorable to sustaining life. Early results showed that meteorite/asteroid materials can support microorganisms, algae and plant cultures under Earth's atmosphere and supplemented with water.

Several observations suggest that diverse planetary materials, similar to meteorites collected on Earth, could be used as agricultural soils, as they provide nutrients to support microscopic life when supplemented with water and an atmosphere. Experimental astroecology has been proposed to rate planetary materials as targets for astrobiology exploration and as potential biological in-situ resources. The biological fertilities of planetary materials can be assessed by measuring water-extractable electrolyte nutrients. The results suggest that carbonaceous asteroids and Martian basalts can serve as potential future resources for substantial biological populations in the Solar System.

Analysis of the essential nutrients (C, N, P, K) in meteorites yielded information for calculating the amount of biomass that can be constructed from asteroid resources. For example, carbonaceous asteroids are estimated to contain about 10^{22} kg potential resource materials, and laboratory results suggest that they could yield a biomass on the order of 6·10^{20} kg, about 100,000 times more than biological matter presently on Earth.

== Cultures on simulated asteroid/meteorite materials ==
To quantify the potential amounts of life in biospheres, theoretical astroecology attempts to estimate the amount of biomass over the duration of a biosphere. The resources, and the potential time-integrated biomass were estimated for planetary systems, for habitable zones around stars, and for the galaxy and the universe. Such astroecology calculations suggest that the limiting elements nitrogen and phosphorus in the estimated 10^{22} kg carbonaceous asteroids could support 6·10^{20} kg biomass for the expected five billion future years of the Sun, yielding a future time-integrated BIOTA (BIOTA, Biomass Integrated Over Times Available, measured in kilogram-years) of 3·10^{30} kg-years in the Solar System, a hundred thousand times more than life on Earth to date. Considering biological requirements of 100 W kg^{−1} biomass, radiated energy about red giant stars and white and red dwarf stars could support a time-integrated BIOTA up to 10^{46} kg-years in the galaxy and 10^{57} kg-years in the universe.

Such astroecology considerations quantify the immense potentials of future life in space, with commensurate biodiversity and possibly, intelligence. Chemical analysis of carbonaceous chondrite meteorites show that they contain extractable bioavailable water, organic carbon, and essential phosphate, nitrate and potassium nutrients. The results allow assessing the soil fertilities of the parent asteroids and planets, and the amounts of biomass that they can sustain.

Laboratory experiments showed that material from the Murchison meteorite, when ground into a fine powder and combined with Earth's water and air, can provide the nutrients to support a variety of organisms including bacteria (Nocardia asteroides), algae, and plant cultures such as potato and asparagus. The microorganisms used organics in the carbonaceous meteorites as the carbon source. Algae and plant cultures grew well also on Mars meteorites because of their high bio-available phosphate contents. The Martian materials achieved soil fertility ratings comparable to productive agricultural soils. This offers some data relating to terraforming of Mars.

Terrestrial analogues of planetary materials are also used in such experiments for comparison, and to test the effects of space conditions on microorganisms.

The biomass that can be constructed from resources can be calculated by comparing the concentration of elements in the resource materials and in biomass (Equation 1). A given mass of resource materials (m_{resource}) can support m_{biomass, X} of biomass containing element X (considering X as the limiting nutrient), where c_{resource, X} is the concentration (mass per unit mass) of element X in the resource material and c_{biomass, X} is its concentration in the biomass.

$m_{biomass,\, X} = m_{resource,\, X} \frac{c_{resource,\, X}}{c_{biomass,\, X}}$ (1)

Assuming that 100,000 kg biomass supports one human, the asteroids may then sustain about 6e15 (six million billion) people, equal to a million Earths (a million times the present population). Similar materials in the comets could support biomass and populations about one hundred times larger. Solar energy can sustain these populations for the predicted further five billion years of the Sun. These considerations yield a maximum time-integrated BIOTA of 3e30 kg-years in the Solar System. After the Sun becomes a white dwarf star, and other white dwarf stars, can provide energy for life much longer, for trillions of eons. (Table 2)

== Effects of wastage ==
Astroecology also concerns wastage, such as the leakage of biological matter into space. This will cause an exponential decay of space-based biomass as given by Equation (2), where M (biomass 0) is the mass of the original biomass, k is its rate of decay (the fraction lost in a unit time) and biomass t is the remaining biomass after time t.

Equation 2: $M_{biomass}(t) = M_{biomass} (0) e^{-kt}\,$

Integration from time zero to infinity yields Equation (3) for the total time-integrated biomass (BIOTA) contributed by this biomass:

Equation 3: $BIOTA = \frac{M_{biomass} (0)}{k}$

For example, if 0.01% of the biomass is lost per year, then the time-integrated BIOTA will be 10,000$M_{biomass} (0)$. For the 6·10^{20} kg biomass constructed from asteroid resources, this yields 6·10^{24} kg-years of BIOTA in the Solar System. Even with this small rate of loss, life in the Solar System would disappear in a few hundred thousand years, and the potential total time-integrated BIOTA of 3·10^{30} kg-years under the main-sequence Sun would decrease by a factor of 5·10^{5}, although a still substantial population of 1.2·10^{12} biomass-supported humans could exist through the habitable lifespan of the Sun. The integrated biomass can be maximized by minimizing its rate of dissipation. If this rate can be reduced sufficiently, all the constructed biomass can last for the duration of the habitat and it pays to construct the biomass as fast as possible. However, if the rate of dissipation is significant, the construction rate of the biomass and its steady-state amounts may be reduced allowing a steady-state biomass and population that lasts throughout the lifetime of the habitat.

An issue that arises is whether we should build immense amounts of life that decays fast, or smaller, but still large, populations that last longer. Life-centered biotic ethics suggests that life should last as long as possible.

== Galactic ecology ==
If life reaches galactic proportions, technology should be able to access all of the materials resources, and sustainable life will be defined by the available energy. The maximum amount of biomass about any star is then determined by the energy requirements of the biomass and by the luminosity of the star. For example, if 1 kg biomass needs 100 Watts, we can calculate the steady-state amounts of biomass that can be sustained by stars with various energy outputs. These amounts are multiplied by the life-time of the star to calculate the time-integrated BIOTA over the life-time of the star. Using similar projections, the potential amounts of future life can then be quantified.

For the Solar System from its origins to the present, the current 10^{15} kg biomass over the past four billion years gives a time-integrated biomass (BIOTA) of 4·10^{24} kg-years. In comparison, carbon, nitrogen, phosphorus and water in the 10^{22} kg asteroids allows 6·10^{20} kg biomass that can be sustained with energy for the 5 billion future years of the Sun, giving a BIOTA of 3·10^{30} kg-years in the Solar System and 3·10^{39} kg-years about 10^{11} stars in the galaxy. Materials in comets could give biomass and time-integrated BIOTA a hundred times larger.

The Sun will then become a white dwarf star, radiating 10^{15} Watts that sustains 1e13 kg biomass for an immense hundred million trillion (10^{20}) years, contributing a time-integrated BIOTA of 10^{33} years. The 10^{12} white dwarfs that may exist in the galaxy during this time can then contribute a time-integrated BIOTA of 10^{45} kg-years. Red dwarf stars with luminosities of 10^{23} Watts and life-times of 10^{13} years can contribute 10^{34} kg-years each, and 10^{12} red dwarfs can contribute 10^{46} kg-years, while brown dwarfs can contribute 10^{39} kg-years of time-integrated biomass (BIOTA) in the galaxy. In total, the energy output of stars during 10^{20} years can sustain a time-integrated biomass of about 10^{45} kg-years in the galaxy. This is one billion trillion (10^{20}) times more life than has existed on the Earth to date. In the universe, stars in 10^{11} galaxies could then sustain 10^{57} kg-years of life.

== Directed panspermia ==
The astroecology results above suggest that humans can expand life in the galaxy through interstellar travel or directed panspermia. The amounts of possible life that can be established in the galaxy, as projected by astroecology, are immense. These projections are based on information about 15 billion past years since the Big Bang, but the habitable future is much longer, spanning trillions of eons. Therefore, physics, astroecology resources, and some cosmological scenarios may allow organized life to last, albeit at an ever slowing rate, indefinitely. These prospects may be addressed by the long-term extension of astroecology as cosmoecology.

== See also ==
- Cosmology
- Meteorites
