= The Journal of Physical Chemistry B =

American academic journal

- Discipline: Physical Chemistry
- Language: English
- Edited by: Joan-Emma Shea

Publication details
- History: 1896-present
- Publisher: American Chemical Society (United States)
- Frequency: Weekly
- Impact factor: 3.5 (2022)

Standard abbreviations
- ISO 4: J. Phys. Chem. B

Indexing
- ISSN: 1520-6106 (print); 1520-5207 (web)

Links
- Journal homepage

The Journal of Physical Chemistry B is a peer-reviewed scientific journal that covers research on several fields of material chemistry (macromolecules, soft matter, and surfactants) as well as statistical mechanics, thermodynamics, and biophysical chemistry. It has been published weekly since 1997 by the American Chemical Society. According to the Journal Citation Reports, the journal had an impact factor of 3.5 for 2023.

Due to the growing amount of research in the fields it covers, the journal was split into two at the beginning of 2007, with The Journal of Physical Chemistry C specializing in nanostructures, the structures and properties of surfaces and interfaces, electronics, and related topics.

== List of editors-in-chief ==
The following persons have been editor-in-chief:

- 1997–2005 Mostafa El-Sayed
- 2005–2019 George C. Schatz
- 2020–Present Joan-Emma Shea

== See also ==
- The Journal of Physical Chemistry A
- The Journal of Physical Chemistry C
- The Journal of Physical Chemistry Letters
