= Mostafa El-Sayed =

Egyptian chemist

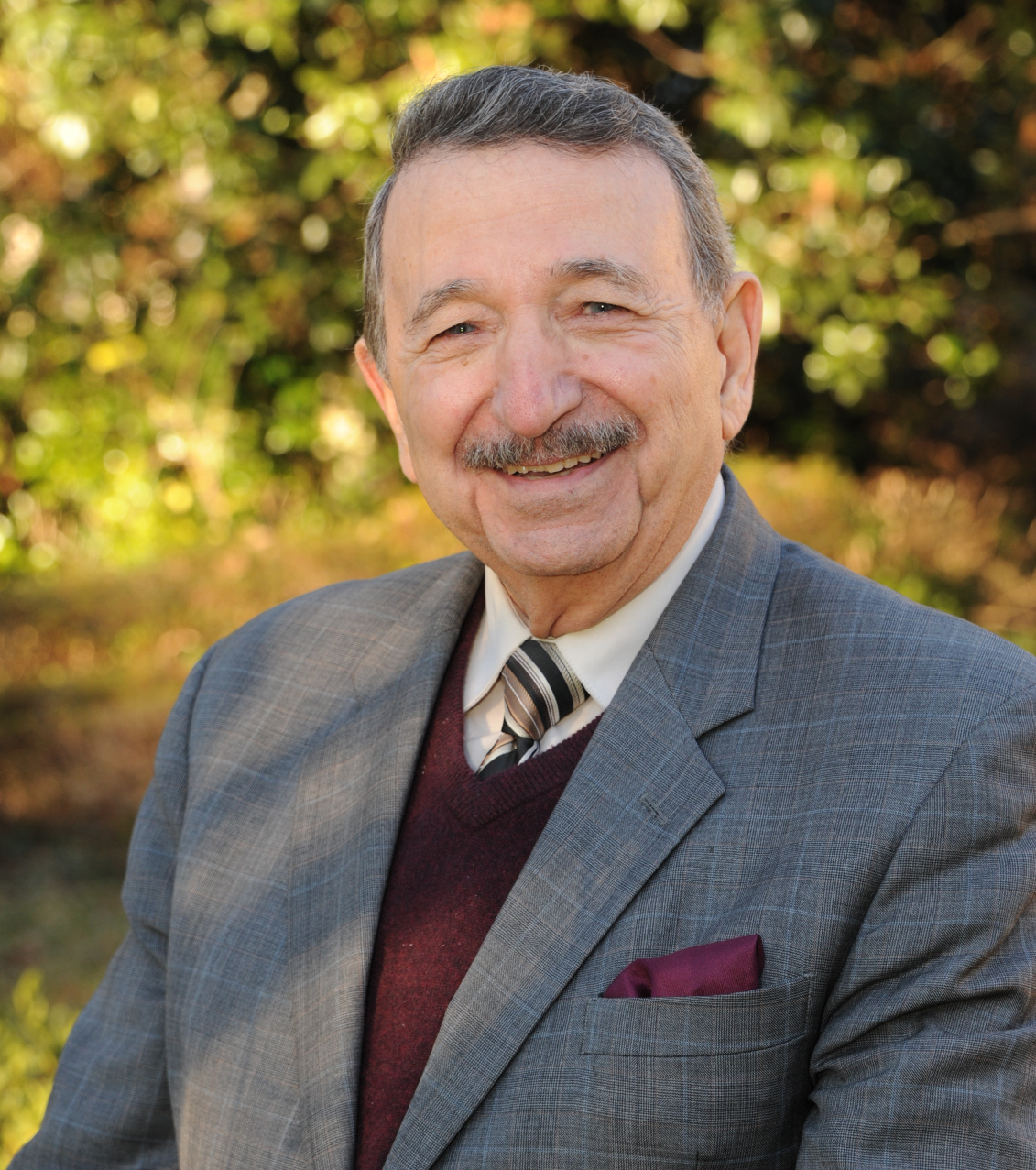
- El-Sayed in March 2016
- Born: 8 May 1933 (age 93); Zifta, Gharbia, Kingdom of Egypt
- Education: Ain Shams University; Florida State University
- Known for: Nanotechnology; Spectroscopy; El-Sayed rule
- Awards: King Faisal International Prize 1990; Irving Langmuir Award 2002; National Medal of Science 2007; Glenn T. Seaborg Medal 2009; Priestley Medal 2016
- Scientific career
- Fields: Chemical physicist
- Workplaces: Georgia Institute of Technology; Harvard University; University of California at Los Angeles
- Doctoral advisor: Michael Kasha

Mostafa A. El-Sayed (Arabic: مصطفى السيد) is an Egyptian-American physical chemist, nanoscience researcher, member of the National Academy of Sciences and US National Medal of Science laureate. He is known for the spectroscopy rule named after him, the El-Sayed rule.

== Early life and academic career ==
El-Sayed was born in Zifta, Egypt and spent his early life in Cairo. He earned his B.Sc. in chemistry from Ain Shams University Faculty of Science, Cairo in 1953. El-Sayed earned his doctoral degree in chemistry from Florida State University working with Michael Kasha, the last student of the legendary G. N. Lewis. While attending graduate school he met and married Janice Jones, his wife of 48 years. He spent time as a post-doctoral researcher at Harvard University, Yale University and the California Institute of Technology before joining the faculty of the University of California at Los Angeles in 1961. In 1994, he retired from UCLA and accepted the position of Julius Brown Chair and Regents Professor of Chemistry and Biochemistry at the Georgia Institute of Technology. He led the Laser Dynamics Lab there until his full retirement in 2020.

El-Sayed is a former editor-in-chief of the Journal of Physical Chemistry (1980–2004).

== Research ==
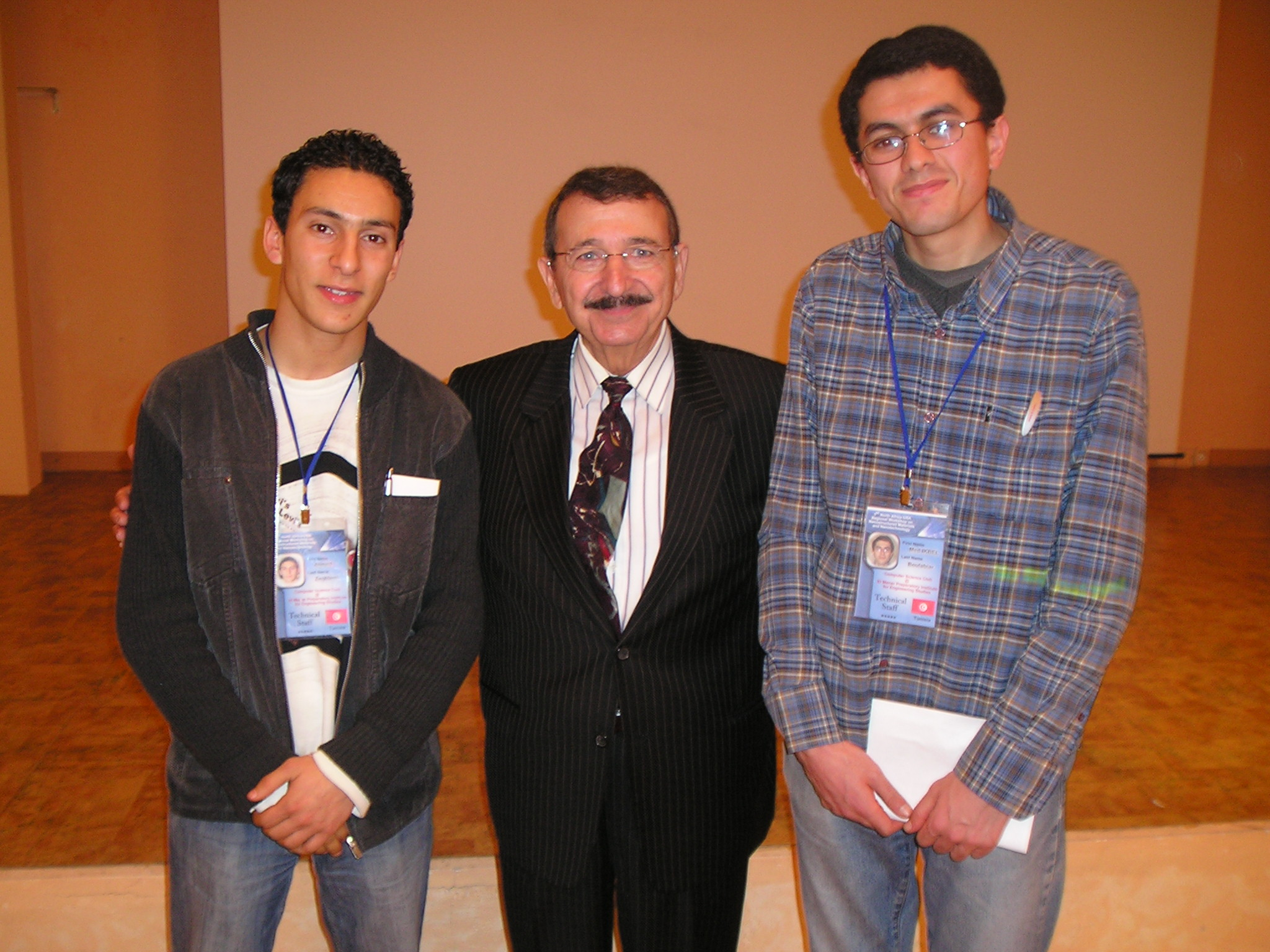
Prof. El-Sayed with two students, 2008

El-Sayed's research interests include the use of steady-state and ultra fast laser spectroscopy to understand relaxation, transport and conversion of energy in molecules, in solids, in photosynthetic systems, semiconductor quantum dots and metal nanostructures. The El-Sayed group has also been involved in the development of new techniques such as magnetophotonic selection, picosecond Raman spectroscopy and phosphorescence microwave double resonance spectroscopy. A major focus of his lab is currently on the optical and chemical properties of noble metal nanoparticles and their applications in nanocatalysis, nanophotonics and nanomedicine. His lab is known for the development of the gold nanorod technology. As of 2021, El-Sayed has produced over 1200 publications in refereed journals in the areas of spectroscopy, molecular dynamics and nanoscience, with over 130,000 citations.

== Honors ==
For his work in the area of applying laser spectroscopic techniques to study of properties and behavior on the nanoscale, El-Sayed was elected to the National Academy of Sciences in 1980. In 1989 he received the Tolman Award, and in 2002, he won the Irving Langmuir Award in Chemical Physics. He has been the recipient of the 1990 King Faisal International Prize ("Arabian Nobel Prize") in Sciences, Georgia Tech's highest award, "The Class of 1943 Distinguished Professor", an honorary doctorate of philosophy from the Hebrew University, and several other awards including some from the different American Chemical Society local sections. He was a Sherman Fairchild Distinguished Scholar at the California Institute of Technology and an Alexander von Humboldt Senior U.S. Scientist Awardee. He served as editor-in-chief of the Journal of Physical Chemistry from 1980 to 2004 and has also served as the U.S. editor of the International Reviews in Physical Chemistry. He is a Fellow of the American Academy of Arts and Sciences, a member of the American Physical Society, the American Association for the Advancement of Science and the Third World Academy of Science. Mostafa El-Sayed was awarded the 2007 US National Medal of Science "for his seminal and creative contributions to our understanding of the electronic and optical properties of nanomaterials and to their applications in nanocatalysis and nanomedicine, for his humanitarian efforts of exchange among countries and for his role in developing the scientific leadership of tomorrow." Mostafa was also announced to be the recipient of the 2009 Ahmed Zewail prize in molecular sciences. In 2011, he was listed #17 in Thomson-Reuters listing of the Top Chemists of the Past Decade. Professor El-Sayed also received the 2016 Priestley Medal, the American Chemical Society’s highest honor, for his decades-long contributions to chemistry.

== The El-Sayed rule ==
The rate of intersystem crossing is relatively large if the radiationless transition involves a change of orbital type.

— Mostafa El-Sayed,

This rule pertains to phosphorescence and similar phenomena. Electrons vibrate and resonate around molecules in different modes (electronic state), usually depending on the energy of the system of electrons. This law states that constant-energy flipping between two electronic states happens more readily when the vibrations of the electrons are preserved during the flip: any change in the spin of an electron is compensated by a change in its orbital motion (spin-orbit coupling).

Intersystem crossing (ISC) is a photophysical process involving an isoenergetic radiationless transition between two electronic states having different multiplicities. It often results in a vibrationally excited molecular entity in the lower electronic state, which then usually decays to its lowest molecular vibrational level. ISC is forbidden by rules of conservation of angular momentum. As a consequence, ISC generally occurs on very long time scales. However, the El-Sayed rule states that the rate of intersystem crossing, e.g. from the lowest singlet state to the triplet manifold, is relatively large if the radiationless transition involves a change of molecular orbital type. For example, a (π,π*) singlet could transition to a (n,π*) triplet state, but not to a (π,π*) triplet state and vice versa. Formulated by El-Sayed in the 1960s, this rule found in most photochemistry textbooks as well as the IUPAC Gold Book. The rule is useful in understanding phosphorescence, vibrational relaxation, intersystem crossing, internal conversion and lifetimes of excited states in molecules.
