= Donald Truhlar =

American chemist

Donald G. Truhlar
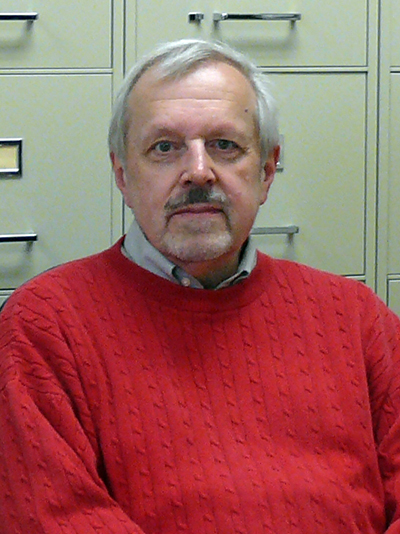
- Truhlar, in his office
- Born: February 27, 1944 (age 82); Chicago, Illinois United States
- Education: St. Mary's College of Minnesota; California Institute of Technology
- Known for: Density functional theory, solvation models, basis sets, quantum chemical methods
- Awards: ACS Award in Theoretical Chemistry (2019)
- Scientific career
- Fields: Computational chemistry, theoretical chemistry, quantum chemistry
- Workplaces: University of Minnesota
- Doctoral advisor: Aron Kuppermann

Donald Gene Truhlar (born 27 February 1944, Chicago) is an American scientist working in theoretical and computational chemistry and chemical physics with special emphases on quantum mechanics and chemical dynamics.

== Early life, education, and early work ==
Donald Gene Truhlar was born in Chicago on 27 February 1944 to John Joseph Truhlar and Lucille Marie Vancura, both of Czech ancestry. Truhlar received a B.A., from St. Mary's College of Minnesota (1965), and a Ph.D., from Caltech (1970), under Aron Kuppermann. He has been on the faculty of the University of Minnesota since 1969.

== Important contributions ==
Truhlar is known for his contributions to theoretical chemical dynamics of chemical reactions; quantum mechanical scattering theory of chemical reactions and molecular energy transfer; electron scattering; theoretical kinetics and chemical dynamics; potential energy surfaces and molecular interactions; path integrals; variational transition state theory; the use of electronic structure theory for calculations of chemical structure, reaction rates, electronically nonadiabatic processes, and solvation effects; photochemistry; combustion chemistry; heterogeneous, homogeneous, and enzyme catalysis; atmospheric and environmental chemistry; drug design; nanoparticle structure and energetics; basis set development; and density functional theory, including the Minnesota Functionals.

== Awards and honors ==
Truhlar was elected to the International Academy of Quantum Molecular Science (2006), the National Academy of Sciences of the USA (2009), and the American Academy of Arts and Sciences (2015). He became an Honorary Fellow of the Chinese Chemical Society in 2015. He was named a Fellow of the American Association for the Advancement of Science, (1986) the American Chemical Society (2009), the American Physical Society (1986), the Royal Society of Chemistry (2009), and the World Association of Theoretical and Computational Chemists (2006). He was a visiting fellow at the Battelle Memorial Institute (1973) and at the Joint Institute for Laboratory Astrophysics (1975–76), and was named an Alfred P. Sloan Foundation Research Fellow (1973).

He received the NSF Creativity Award (1993), the ACS Award for Computers in Chemical and Pharmaceutical Research (2000), the Minnesota Award (2003) ("for outstanding contributions to the chemical sciences"), the National Academy of Sciences Award for Scientific Reviewing (2004); the ACS Peter Debye Award for Physical Chemistry (2006), the Lise Meitner Lectureship Award (2006), the Schrödinger Medal of The World Association of Theoretical and Computational Chemists (2006), the Dudley R. Herschbach Award for Research in Molecular Collision Dynamics (2009), Doctor honoris causa of Technical University of Lodz, Poland, (2010), the Royal Society of Chemistry Chemical Dynamics Award (2012), the APS Earle K. Plyler Prize for Molecular Spectroscopy and Dynamics (2015), the 2019 ACS Award in Theoretical Chemistry (2018), and the 2023 Joseph O. Hirschfelder Prize in Theoretical Chemistry.

Truhlar has served as an associate editor of the Journal of the American Chemical Society (1984–2016), as (successively) editor, editor-in-chief, associate editor, and chief advisory editor of Theoretical Chemistry Accounts (formerly Theoretica Chimica Acta) (1985–present), and as a principal editor of Computer Physics Communications (1986–2015). He is currently a Regents professor at the University of Minnesota, which is the university's highest honor. The University of Minnesota has also honored him as a Distinguished University Teaching Professor and a College of Science & Engineering Distinguished Professor.
