= The Journal of Physical Chemistry Letters =

American academic journal

- Discipline: Physical chemistry
- Language: English
- Edited by: Gregory D. Scholes

Publication details
- History: 2010–present
- Publisher: ACS Publications (United States)
- Frequency: Biweekly
- Impact factor: 4.7 (2024)

Standard abbreviations
- ISO 4: J. Phys. Chem. Lett.

Indexing
- CODEN: JPCLCD
- ISSN: 1948-7185
- OCLC no.: 819373282

Links
- Journal homepage; Online access; Online archive

The Journal of Physical Chemistry Letters is a peer-reviewed scientific journal published by the American Chemical Society. The editor-in-chief is Gregory D. Scholes at Princeton University. The Journal of Physical Chemistry Letters covers research on all aspects of physical chemistry. George C. Schatz was editor-in-chief from 2010 to 2019.

== Scope ==
The Journal of Physical Chemistry Letters publishes letters, perspectives on emerging topics, editorials and viewpoints. Specific materials of interest will include, but are not limited to:

- Physical Insights into Quantum Phenomena and Function
- Physical Insights into Materials and Molecular Properties
- Physical Insights into Light Interacting with Matter
- Physical Insights into the Biosphere, Atmosphere, and Space
- Physical Insights into Chemistry, Catalysis, and Interfaces
- Physical Insights into Energy Science

== Abstracting, indexing, and impact factor ==
According to the Journal Citation Reports, the journal had an impact factor of 6.88 for 2021.

It is indexed in the following bibliographic databases:

- Cambridge Structural Database (Cambridge Crystallographic Data Centre)
- Chemical Abstracts Service/SciFinder (ACS)
- ChemWeb (ChemIndustry.com)
- Chimica Database (Elsevier)
- Current Contents: Physical, Chemical & Earth Sciences (Thomson Reuters)
- INSPEC (IET)
- Journal Citation Reports/Science Edition (Thomson Reuters)
- Nature Index (Springer Nature)
- PASCAL Database (INIST/CNRS)
- Science Citation Index (Thomson Reuters)
- Science Citation Index Expanded (Thomson Reuters)
- SCOPUS (Elsevier)
- VINITI (All-Russian Institute of Science & Technological Information)
- Web of Science (Thomson Reuters)

== See also ==
- The Journal of Physical Chemistry A
- The Journal of Physical Chemistry B
- The Journal of Physical Chemistry C
