= Russian Journal of Physical Chemistry B =

- Discipline: Chemical physics, combustion
- Language: English
- Edited by: Anatoly L. Buchachenko

Publication details
- History: 2007–present (1982–present in Russian)
- Publisher: MAIK Nauka/Interperiodica; Springer Science+Business Media
- Frequency: Bimonthly
- Impact factor: 1.296 (2021)

Standard abbreviations
- ISO 4: Russ. J. Phys. Chem. B

Indexing
- CODEN: RJPCCT
- ISSN: 1990-7931 (print); 1990-7923 (web)
- LCCN: 2008249059
- OCLC no.: 785834532

Links
- Journal homepage; Online access; Journal page at MAIK Nauka/Interperiodican

The Russian Journal of Physical Chemistry B (Russian: Химическая физика, romanized: Khimicheskaya fizika) is an English-language translation of the eponymous Russian-language peer-reviewed scientific journal published by MAIK Nauka/Interperiodica and Springer Science+Business Media. The journal covers all aspects of chemical physics and combustion. The editor-in-chief is Anatoly L. Buchachenko (Russian Academy of Sciences).

== Abstracting and indexing ==
- Current Contents/Physical, Chemical and Earth Sciences
- Reaction Citation Index
- Science Citation Index Expanded
- Journal Citation Reports/Science Edition
- Chemical Abstracts Service
- Scopus
- Inspec

== See also ==
- Russian Journal of Physical Chemistry A
