= Pietrusza Wola =

- Village
- Location within Poland
- Coordinates: 49°49′N 21°41′E
- Country: Poland
- Voivodeship: Subcarpathian
- County: Krosno
- Gmina: Wojaszówka
- Time zone: UTC+1 (CET)
  - Summer (DST): UTC+2 (CEST)

Pietrusza Wola [pʲɛˈtruʂa ˈvɔla] is a village in the administrative district of Gmina Wojaszówka, within Krosno County, Subcarpathian Voivodeship, in south-eastern Poland. Its approximate population is 300.

Its registered population as of March 2021 census is 274.

Five Polish citizens were murdered by Nazi Germany in the village during World War II.
