= The Journal of Physical Chemistry A =

American academic journal

- April 2004 cover
- Discipline: Physical chemistry
- Language: English
- Edited by: Joan-Emma Shea

Publication details
- History: 1896 to present
- Publisher: American Chemical Society (United States)
- Frequency: Weekly
- Impact factor: 2.7 (2023)

Standard abbreviations
- ISO 4: J. Phys. Chem. A

Indexing
- CODEN: JPCAFH
- ISSN: 1089-5639 (print); 1520-5215 (web)

Links
- Journal homepage

The Journal of Physical Chemistry A is a scientific journal which reports research on the chemistry of molecules - including their dynamics, spectroscopy, kinetics, structure, bonding, and quantum chemistry. It is published weekly by the American Chemical Society.

Before 1997 the title was simply Journal of Physical Chemistry. Owing to the ever-growing amount of research in the area, in 1997 the journal was split into Journal of Physical Chemistry A (molecular theoretical and experimental physical chemistry) and The Journal of Physical Chemistry B (solid state, soft matter, liquids, etc.). Beginning in 2007, the latter underwent a further split, with The Journal of Physical Chemistry C now being dedicated to nanotechnology, molecular electronics, and related subjects.

According to the Journal Citation Reports, the journal have an impact factor of 2.7 for 2023.

== Editors-in-chief ==
- 1896–1932 Wilder Dwight Bancroft, Joseph E. Trevor
- 1933–1951 S. C. Lind
- 1952–1964 William A. Noyes
- 1965–1969 F. T. Wall
- 1970–1980 Bryce Crawford
- 1980–2004 Mostafa El-Sayed
- 2005–2019 George C. Schatz
- 2020–present Joan-Emma Shea

== Popular culture ==
Sheldon Cooper, a fictional physicist from the television series The Big Bang Theory, appeared on the cover of a fictional issue of the journal.

== See also ==
- The Journal of Physical Chemistry B
- The Journal of Physical Chemistry C
- The Journal of Physical Chemistry Letters
- Russian Journal of Physical Chemistry A
- Russian Journal of Physical Chemistry B
