= Joan-Emma Shea =

American chemist

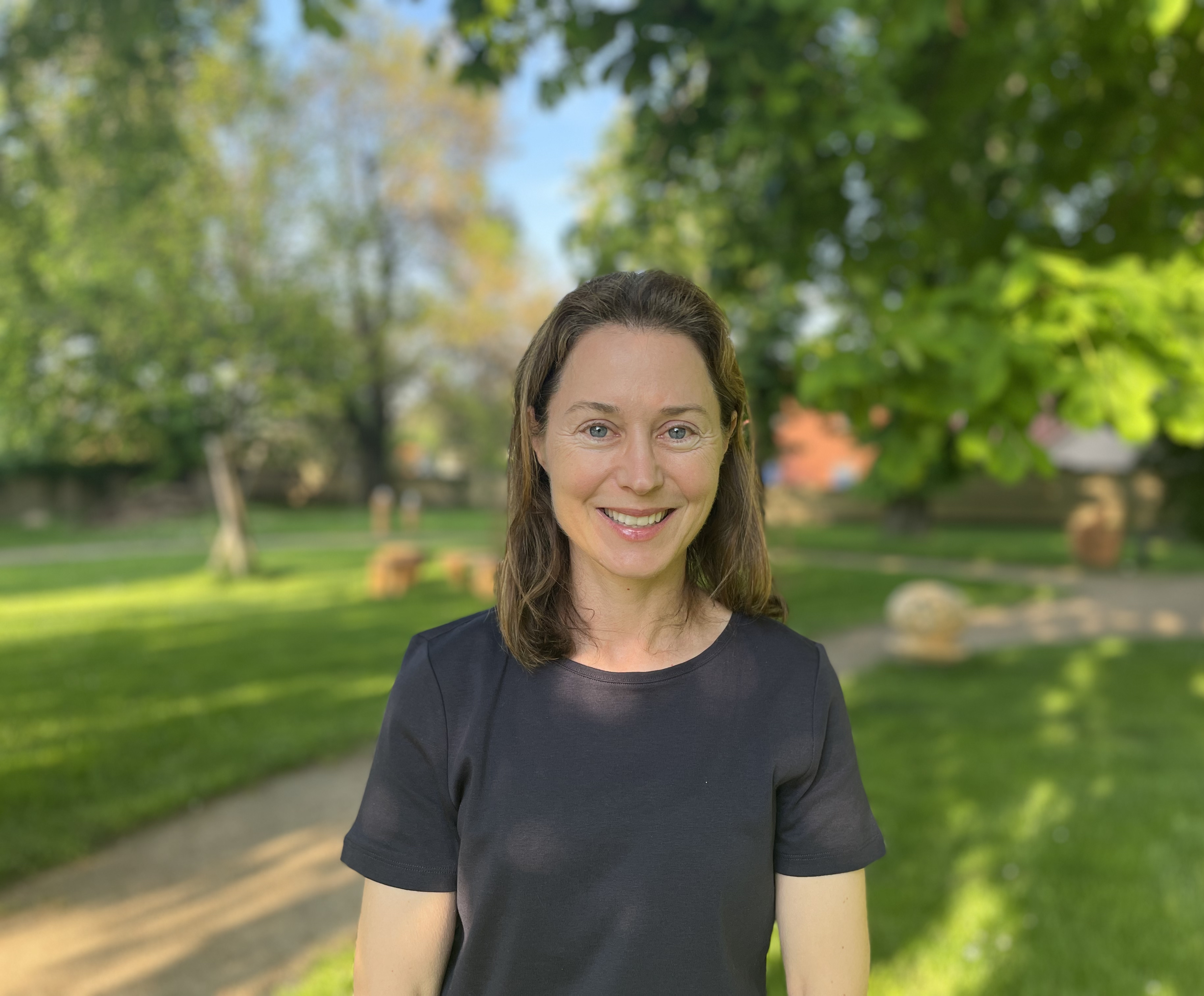
- Born: 1972 (age 53–54); Santa Barbara, California
- Education: McGill University; Massachusetts Institute of Technology
- Scientific career
- Workplaces: University of California, San Diego
- Thesis: Brownian motion in a non-equilibrium bath (1997)

Joan-Emma Shea is an American chemist who is a professor at the University of California, Santa Barbara. Her research applies statistical and computational approaches to address biological problems. She is a Fellow of both the American Physical Society and the American Chemical Society, and the editor-in-chief of the Journal of Physical Chemistry.

== Early life and education ==
Shea was born in Santa Barbara, California. She was an undergraduate student at McGill University and a doctoral student at the Massachusetts Institute of Technology, where her research considered Brownian motion. She was awarded a National Sciences and Engineering Research Council of Canada fellowship, and joined Charles L. Brooks III at the University of California, San Diego and Scripps Research.

== Research and career ==
Shea joined the James Franck Institute at the University of Chicago in 2000, where she spent one year before joining the University of California, Santa Barbara. She became a professor at the University of California, Santa Barbara in 2008. Her work considers the chemistry of cellular processes, including in vivo protein folding. In particular, She studies intrinsically disordered proteins, biomolecules which do not fold to a single, 3D shape, but instead rapidly interconvert between many conformations in their monomeric forms. Some intrinsically disordered proteins can self-assemble into fibrillar aggregates and/or undergo a process called liquid-liquid phase separation. Shea studies these processes using computational and statistical approaches

In 2019, Shea was elected as editor-in-chief of the Journal of Physical Chemistry (A, B and C). She was the first woman to hold this position in the 124-year history of the journal.

== Awards and honors ==
- 2002 National Science Foundation CAREER Award
- 2003 David and Lucile Packard Award
- 2004 Alfred P. Sloan Research Fellow
- 2011 Elected Fellow of the American Physical Society
- 2022 Elected Fellow of the American Chemical Society

== Selected publications ==
- Summer L Bernstein; Nicholas F Dupuis; Noel D Lazo; et al. (1 July 2009). "Amyloid-β protein oligomerization and the importance of tetramers and dodecamers in the aetiology of Alzheimer's disease". Nature Chemistry. 1 (4): 326–331. doi:10.1038/nchem.247. ISSN 1755-4330. PMC 2918915. PMID 20703363. Wikidata Q34055098.
- Shea JE; Brooks CL 3rd (1 January 2001). "From folding theories to folding proteins: a review and assessment of simulation studies of protein folding and unfolding". Annual Review of Physical Chemistry. 52: 499–535. doi:10.1146/annurev.physchem.52.1.499. ISSN 0066-426X. PMID 11326073. Wikidata Q30168219.
- Andriy Baumketner; Summer L Bernstein; Thomas Wyttenbach; Gal Bitan; David B Teplow; Michael T Bowers; Joan-Emma Shea (1 March 2006). "Amyloid beta-protein monomer structure: a computational and experimental study". Protein Science. 15 (3): 420–428. doi:10.1110/ps.051762406. ISSN 0961-8368. PMC 2249763. PMID 16501222. Wikidata Q42150321.
