= Acta Societatis Botanicorum Poloniae =

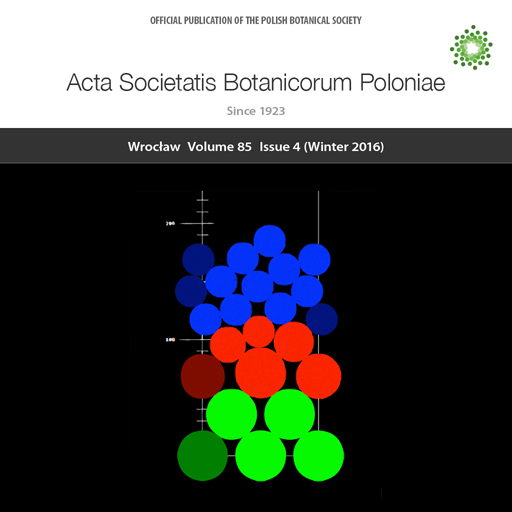
- Discipline: Botany
- Language: English
- Edited by: Beata Zagórska-Marek

Publication details
- History: 1923–present
- Publisher: Polish Botanical Society (Poland)
- Frequency: Quarterly
- Open access: Yes
- License: CC-BY-4.0
- Impact factor: 1.213 (2015)

Standard abbreviations
- ISO 4: Acta Soc. Bot. Pol.

Indexing
- ISSN: 0001-6977 (print); 2083-9480 (web)
- OCLC no.: 667893187

Links
- Journal homepage; Online access; Online archive

Acta Societatis Botanicorum Poloniae is a quarterly peer-reviewed scientific journal published by the Polish Botanical Society. It covers all areas of botany. According to the Journal Citation Reports, the journal has a 2015 impact factor of 1.213.

The subsequent editors-in-chief have been: Dezydery Szymkiewicz (1922–1930), Kazimierz Bassalik (1930–1937), Kazimierz Piech (1938–1939), Dezydery Szymkiewicz and Kazimierz Bassalik (1945–1947), Kazimierz Bassalik (1948–1949), Kazimierz Bassalik and Wacław Gajewski (1949–1960), Wacław Gajewski and Henryk Teleżyński (1960–1977), Bohdan Rodkiewicz (1980–1990), Stefan Zajączkowski (1991–1992), Jerzy Fabiszewski (1993–2010), and Beata Zagórska-Marek (since 2011).

Since 2016, the journal is available exclusively as an online edition.
