= Chemical Physics Letters =

- Discipline: Chemical physics, physical chemistry
- Language: English
- Edited by: D.C. Clary, B. Dietzek, K-L. Han, A. Karton

Publication details
- History: 1967-present
- Publisher: Elsevier
- Frequency: Biweekly
- Open access: hybrid
- Impact factor: 2.8 (2022)

Standard abbreviations
- ISO 4: Chem. Phys. Lett.

Indexing
- ISSN: 0009-2614

Links
- Journal homepage; Online access

Chemical Physics Letters is a biweekly peer-reviewed scientific journal covering research in chemical physics and physical chemistry. It was established in 1967 and is published by Elsevier. The editors-in-chief are David C. Clary, B. Dietzek, K-L. Han, and A. Karton.
