= Russian Journal of Physical Chemistry A =

- Discipline: Physical chemistry
- Language: English, Russian
- Edited by: Aslan Yu. Tsivadze

Publication details
- Former name: Russian Journal of Physical Chemistry
- History: 1930–present
- Publisher: Springer Science+Business Media on behalf of Pleiades Publishing
- Frequency: Monthly
- Open access: Hybrid
- Impact factor: 0.7 (2022)

Standard abbreviations
- ISO 4: Russ. J. Phys. Chem. A

Indexing
- CODEN: RJPCBS
- ISSN: 0036-0244 (print); 1531-863X (web)
- LCCN: 2008249012
- OCLC no.: 457267800

Links
- Journal homepage; Online archive; Journal page at Pleiades Publishing

The Russian Journal of Physical Chemistry A: Focus on Chemistry (Russian: Журнал физической химии, romanized: Zhurnal fizicheskoi khimii) is an English-language translation of the eponymous Russian-language peer-reviewed scientific journal published by Springer Science+Business Media on behalf of Pleiades Publishing. It was established in 1930 and focuses on review articles pertaining to global coverage of all theory and experiment in physical chemistry. The editor-in-chief is Aslan Yu. Tsivadze (Russian Academy of Sciences).

== Abstracting and indexing ==
The journal is abstracted and indexed in:

- Aquatic Sciences & Fisheries Abstracts
- Chemical Abstracts Service
- Current Contents/Physical, Chemical & Earth Sciences
- Ei-Compendex
- Science Citation Index Expanded
- Scopus

According to the Journal Citation Reports, the journal has a 2022 impact factor of 0.7.

== See also ==
- Russian Journal of Physical Chemistry B
