= Vincent (surname) =

Vincent can be used as a first name or a surname (last name). Notable people with the surname include:

- A. Vincent (1959–2019), Mathematician, Kollam, Kerala, India
- A. Vincent, Malayalam film director and cinematographer
- Alex Vincent (actor)
- Alex Vincent (drummer)
- Alice Vincent (born 1988), English horticulturalist, writer/journalist
- Anaïs Vincent (born 2000), French Para-cyclist
- Angela Vincent, biologist
- Arthur Vincent (politician), Irish politician and barrister
- Ashley Vincent, English footballer
- Beverly M. Vincent
- Bev Vincent (born 1961), Canadian novelist, short story writer and chemist, working in Texas
- Brooke Vincent (born 1992), English actress
- Carole Vincent (1939–2019), English sculptor
- Cerina Vincent (born 1979), American actor and writer
- Charles Vincent (disambiguation)
- Charlotte Vincent, British choreographer
- Clinton D. "Casey" Vincent, USAF general, fighter ace
- Colin Vincent
- Cyril Vincent (1902–1968), South African cricketer
- David Vincent (courtier) (died 1565), keeper of the royal wardrobe
- David Vincent (musician) (born 1965), American musician
- Edgar Vincent, 1st Viscount D'Abernon
- Edgar L. Vincent (1851–1936), American politician, newspaper editor, farmer, writer, and politician
- Edward Vincent (1934–2012), US politician, Californian state senator
- Edward A. Vincent
- Edward F. Vincent (1881–1940), New York politician
- Fay Vincent (1938–2025), American entertainment lawyer, and sports executive
- Francis Thomas Vincent Jr.
- François-Elie Vincent
- Frank Vincent, American actor, musician, author and entrepreneur
- Gene Vincent (1935–1971), American rock and roll musician
- George Vincent (disambiguation)
- Georgette Vincent, All-American Girls Professional Baseball League player
- H. Vincent (Jean Hyacinthe Vincent)
- Hal W. Vincent (1927–2015), US Marine Corps general
- Henriette Vincent (1786–1834), French botanical painter
- Holly Vincent
- Hugh Vincent (1862–1931), Welsh rugby player
- Innocent Vincent
- Isabel Vincent
- Jamie Vincent
- Jan-Michael Vincent (1945–2019), American actor
- Jay Vincent
- Jean Vincent (1930–2013), French footballer and manager
- Jean Hyacinthe Vincent
- Jean-Didier Vincent (1935–2024), French neurobiologist and neuropsychiatrist
- John Jervis, 1st Earl of St Vincent (1735–1823), British Admiral of the Fleet
- John Vincent (general) (1764–1848), British general
- John Vincent (historian), British historian
- John Carter Vincent
- June Vincent
- Justin Vincent
- Kary Vincent (1969–2018), American football player
- Kary Vincent Jr. (born 1999), American football player
- Keydrick Vincent
- Kira Vincent-Davis
- Kyle Vincent
- Lou Vincent, New England cricketer
- Louis-Hugues Vincent (1872–1960), French archaeologist and Dominican friar in Jerusalem
- Marcel Vincent
- Mark Sinclair Vincent or Vin Diesel
- Marjorie Vincent
- Mary Ann Vincent
- Ned Vincent, English footballer
- Nick Vincent (musician)
- Nick Vincent (baseball)
- Norah Vincent
- Patrice Vincent, Canadian soldier killed in the 2014 Saint-Jean-sur-Richelieu ramming attack
- Phil Vincent, British motorcycle pioneer
- Pierre H. Vincent
- Pierre L. J. Vincent
- Ra Vincent, set decorator
- Rhonda Vincent
- Richard Vincent, Baron Vincent of Coleshill
- Richard Vincent (playwright)
- Robert Vincent (disambiguation)
- Sam Vincent (basketball) (born 1963), American basketball player
- Sam Vincent
- Shelly Vincent (born 1979), American professional boxer
- Sonny Vincent
- Stanley Vincent (1897–1976), senior commander in the Royal Air Force
- Sténio Vincent
- Steven Vincent, American author and journalist
- Strong Vincent
- Swale Vincent British physician
- Taron Vincent (born 2000), American football player
- Ted Vincent (born 1956), American football player
- Tim Vincent
- Tony Vincent
- Troy Vincent
- Vinnie Vincent (born 1952), American guitarist
- Vincent (Surrey cricketer), English cricketer
- Vincent (singer), full name Vincent Pontare, a Swedish singer
