= Donald Seldin =

- Born: October 24, 1920; Brooklyn, New York
- Died: April 25, 2018 (aged 97); Dallas, Texas
- Education: Yale University School of Medicine; New York University
- Scientific career
- Fields: internal medicine, nephrology
- Workplaces: University of Texas Southwestern Medical Center

Donald Wayne Seldin (October 24, 1920 – April 25, 2018) was an American nephrologist. He worked at University of Texas Southwestern Medical Center and served as chair of the department of medicine for 36 years.

Seldin has been referred to as the "intellectual father of UT Southwestern Medical Center", and transformed a school housed in a dilapidated barracks into a world renowned medical center. He is noted for his contributions to medical ethics and research in kidney function.

== Early life and education ==
Seldin was born in Brooklyn, New York on October 24, 1920. His father was an immigrant from Bessarabia, and his mother's parents immigrated from Vienna prior to her birth. He grew up during the Great Depression, and worked while in school delivering groceries. He had one sister, who died at age 27. He graduated from high school at age 16, and studied literature at New York University, receiving his bachelors of arts in 1940. He graduated from Yale University School of Medicine in 1943.

== Career ==
Seldin served as a captain in the U.S. Army Medical Corps from 1946 to 1948, where he served as the chief of medicine and ran the laboratory at the 98th General Hospital, a military hospital in Germany. While there, he was called to Dachau to testify at the trial of a Nazi physician accused of human experimentation resulting in the deaths of 40 prisoners. The doctor, who had trained at The Rockefeller University, defended himself at the trial. Seldin testified for three days, and the doctor was sentenced to death. He attributed his interest in medical ethics to this experience.

After his military service, he worked as a professor at Yale University until 1951.

In 1951, Seldin was recruited to the University of Texas Southwestern Medical Center, where he worked for 67 years.

When Seldin joined UT Southwestern, it was the newest medical center in the country, and was housed in a dilapidated army barracks. When he arrived, Seldin described it as "shacks and trash", with holes in the floor and broken windows. Within 6 months, the physician who recruited him left, leaving him as the only full-time faculty member of the medical center, and earning him the position of chair by default. The school was placed on probation by the accrediting agency. Seldin was present at Parkland Hospital when President John F. Kennedy was rushed in after being fatally wounded in Dealey Plaza. He was interviewed for the 2023 documentary JFK: What the Doctors Saw.

He served as chair of the department of medicine from 1952 to 1988. He was credited with greatly increasing the stature of the institution and recruiting top faculty. Many of the students and faculty he recruited have become leaders in medicine, including Dan Foster, Manuel Martinez-Maldonado, Jean Wilson, Kern Wildenthal, Roland Blantz, Floyd Rector, Helen Hobbs, John Fordtran, John Dietschy, and Michael Brown and Joseph Goldstein, who together won the 1985 Nobel Prize in Physiology or Medicine. He also trained over 200 residents in the field of nephrology with at UTSW. During his leadership, the once-decaying school was transformed into a world-class medical center with five Nobel laureates and an endowment of more than $1 billion.

In the 1970s, Seldin served as a Commissioner on the National Commission for the Protection of Human Subjects, which published the Belmont Report, which dictates standards ethical behavior of researchers involving humans.

During the course of his career, Seldin was the president of seven major professional societies: the Central Society for Clinical Research, the Southern Society of Clinical Investigation, the American Society for Clinical Investigation, the American Society of Nephrology, the Association of Professors of Medicine, the Association of American Physicians, and the International Society of Nephrology. He was a founder of the American Society of Nephrology. In 1974, he was elected fellow of the American Academy of Arts and Sciences.

== Personal life and death ==
In 1943, he married Muriel Goldberg. After her death in 1994, he married Ellen Lee Taylor, a physician. He has three children from his first marriage. Seldin died of lymphoma in 2018.

=== Research ===
Seldin has been recognized for his research in the field of nephrology. A 1990 book on the history of the National Kidney Foundation states that "Nephrology in the United States is what it is today because one day, many years ago, Donald W. Seldin decided to make it his major area of interest."

He and Robert Tarail first described how glucose behaves as a solute causing water to exit cells due to the change in concentration gradient in uncontrolled diabetes. He is known as an author of one of the fundamental textbooks in Nephrology, Seldin and Giebisch's The Kidney. In collaboration with others, he has published research on a variety of topics in the field of nephrology, including the factors affecting acid-base homeostasis, the role of the kidney in determining osmolarity and volume of blood, and the basic functions of renal tubules.

== Awards and honors ==
UT Southwestern's Seldin Plaza is named in his honor, and a 7-foot statue of him is displayed there. UTSW has named several professorships for him: the Donald W. Seldin Distinguished Chair in Internal Medicine, the Donald W. Seldin Professorship in Clinical Investigation, and the Sinor-Pritchard Professorship in Medical Education Honoring Donald W. Seldin, M.D.

UTSW's department holds an annual Donald W. Seldin Research Symposium.

The National Kidney Foundation has awarded the Donald W. Seldin Award annually since 1994. The American Society for Clinical Investigation awards the Donald Seldin–Holly Smith Award for Pioneering Research.

In 1985, Seldin received the George M. Kober Medal from the Association of American Physicians.

Seldin is an elected member of the National Academy of Medicine.
