= Helen Hobbs =

American medical researcher

- Born: May 5, 1952 (age 74); Boston, Massachusetts
- Education: Stanford University (BS) Case Western Reserve University School of Medicine (MD)
- Occupation: Professor
- Employer: University of Texas Southwestern Medical Center

Helen Haskell Hobbs (born May 5, 1952 in Boston, Massachusetts) is an American medical researcher who is professor at the University of Texas Southwestern Medical Center, and a Howard Hughes Medical Institute Investigator, who won a 2016 Breakthrough Prize in Life Sciences and the 2018 Harrington Prize for Innovation in Medicine. Hobbs specializes in the dysregulation of lipid metabolism and how it affects human diseases. She and Jonathan C. Cohen found that people with hypomorphic PCSK9 mutations had lower LDL-cholesterol levels and were almost immune to heart disease. This finding led to the development of a new class of cholesterol-lowering drugs that mimic the effects of the PCSK9 mutations. She and Cohen also identified the first genetic risk factor for fatty liver disease, a burgeoning health problem that can lead to cirrhosis and liver cancer. Their laboratory has shown that mutation in PNPLA3 causes accumulation of PNPLA3 on lipid droplets, which compromises the mobilization of triglycerides from liver cells. She sits on the Board of Directors at Pfizer.

== Education ==
Hobbs graduated from Stanford University and went to medical school at Case Western Reserve University School of Medicine. She completed an internship in internal medicine at Columbia-Presbyterian Medical Center, where she met her future husband, a Texan who trained at UT Southwestern. Together, Hobbs and her husband, Dr. Dennis Stone, moved to Dallas, Texas in 1980, where she completed her medical training at Parkland Memorial Hospital, including a one-year stint as chief resident.

Following the advice of Donald Seldin, the chairman of medicine at UT Southwestern Medical Center, she chose to pursue research after residency. Again, following Dr. Seldin's recommendation, Hobbs took a research post-doctoral position studying lipoproteins at UT Southwestern in the laboratory of Michael S. Brown and Joseph L. Goldstein, Nobel Prize in Medicine winners in 1985.

== Research ==
In 1987 Hobbs joined the faculty of UT Southwestern Medical Center where she is the Eugene McDermott Distinguished Chair for the Study of Human Growth and Development. In 1999, she co-founded the Dallas Heart Study with a grant from the Donald W. Reynolds Foundation. This study takes genetic samples of a representative segment of the population of Dallas County, and correlates them to the subject's health metrics. Through this study, she found that variations in the gene PCSK9 led to lower plasma cholesterol and protection from cardiovascular disease. Another major focus of her career is to understand the basis of fatty liver disease. She and Jonathan Cohen have shown that variations in the DNA sequences of PNPLA3 and TM6SF2 confer susceptibility to fatty liver disease, soon to be the number one indication for liver transplantation.

== Awards ==
Year	Award
2019	Anitschkow Prize
2018	Foundation Lefoulon-Delalande Grand prix Award
2018	Harrington Prize for Innovation in Medicine
2017	Schottenstein Prize
2016	Passano Award (with Jonathan C. Cohen)
2015	Breakthrough Prize in Life Sciences
2015	Pearl Meister Greengard Prize, Rockefeller University
2012	International Atherosclerosis Society Prize
2007	American Heart Association Distinguished Scientist Award
2007	National Academy of Sciences
2006	American Academy of Arts and Sciences
2005	Heinrich Wieland Prize
2004	National Academy of Medicine
1997	Association of American Physicians
1991	American Society for Clinical Investigation
