= Seymour S. Kety =

American neuroscientist

- Born: Philadelphia, Pennsylvania; August 25, 1915
- Died: May 25, 2000 (aged 84)
- Education: University of Pennsylvania
- Known for: Use of citrate to decrease lead poisoning; study of schizophrenia
- Spouse: Josephine Gross
- Awards: Ralph W. Gerard Prize in Neuroscience, NAS Award in the Neurosciences
- Scientific career
- Fields: Psychiatry, genetics
- Institutions: Philadelphia General Hospital, University of Pennsylvania, Harvard, Johns Hopkins University
- Academic advisors: Joseph Charles Aub

Seymour S. Kety (August 25, 1915 – May 25, 2000) was an American neuroscientist who was credited with making modern psychiatry a rigorous and heuristic branch of medicine by applying basic science to the study of human behavior in health and disease. After Kety died, his colleague Louis Sokoloff noted that: "He discovered a method for measuring blood flow in the brain, was the first scientific director of the National Institute of Mental Health (NIMH) and produced the most-definitive evidence for the essential involvement of genetic factors in schizophrenia."

== Childhood ==
Semyour S. Kety was born in Philadelphia, Pennsylvania in 1915. Raised in a humble family household in Philadelphia, Kety was intellectually challenged and stimulated. As a child, Kety was involved in a car accident that injured his foot. Though he could still walk, Kety remained slightly physically impaired.

== Schooling ==
For his education, Kety stayed in his home town of Philadelphia. Kety attended Central High School in Philadelphia and found himself excelling greatly in chemistry. Running his own experiments in his homemade laboratory, Kety found a passion for chemistry. Throughout high school, he pursued his interest in the physical sciences and also gained knowledge of both Greek and Latin. Kety attended college and medical school at the University of Pennsylvania, from which he graduated in 1940. He did a rotating internship at the Philadelphia General Hospital, but that was the extent of his clinical training. After finishing his internship, Kety went into research.

== Kety's first contribution to science ==
During his internship, he married Josephine Gross, a childhood friend. She too was studying to be a doctor. Josephine wanted to be a pediatrician, which inspired Seymour to do research and study more about children. An increase in lead poisoning led to Kety's first contribution to medicine. More and more children came down with lead poisoning because they were chewing on their cribs, coated in paint containing lead. Seymour began to think about citrate to relieve the children of their lead poisoning. Citrate would help flush the lead out of the children's systems through urination. Called a chelating agent, citrate was the first thing used to help treat heavy metal intoxication.

== Kety's slow transition to psychology ==
Following his internship, Kety decided to continue his research of lead poisoning. The National Research Council post-doctorate fellowship, received by Kety to continue his research, began in 1942. Kety worked under the supervision of lead poisoning specialist Joseph Charles Aub. Only after Seymour arrived prepared to start his fellowship did he learn that Aub changed his area of study — he was now working with traumatic and hemorrhagic shock. Joseph Aub changed his work to study the shock because it was a time of war, and the research was pressing. While working with Aub, Kety found the circulation of the heart to be fascinating. Instead of returning to Harvard, Kety went to his alma mater, the University of Pennsylvania. While back in Pennsylvania, Seymour worked with Carl Schmidt, an expert in cerebral circulation. Kety became a pharmacology instructor at the university.

Seymour was very popular among his students. Soon, everyone that knew Kety learned that he had a profound interest in cerebral circulation. His desire for knowledge was mostly to understand the process and to measure the flow of blood. Eventually, Kety and Schmidt worked together to form experiments about the cerebral circulation in a human. In time, they found a very effective method of measuring the flow of blood. Their work together was revolutionary.

After collaborating with many doctors on various projects, Seymour S. Kety became the chairman of the department of psychiatry at Johns Hopkins University in 1961. After only one year, Kety resigned due to his lack of experience in psychiatry. He returned to his job as the Chief of Laboratory Science. Seymour, however, continued the research he was working on. He was researching the causes of schizophrenia. His focus was based on the genetic influences that cause the disease.

== Kety's results ==
Seymour spent much of his life studying schizophrenia. He said that genetic influences may be largely responsible for psychosis, comparing it to phenylketonuria or Huntington's disease. Kety's discoveries have been used and further developed into new theories. In 1959, Kety got interested in Paul Wender's work at the St Elizabeth's Hospital. They applied the so called Danish-American adoption study of schizophrenia methodology, where they compared data from biological and adoptive parents of schizophrenic children, and successfully linked schizophrenia to genetic causes. The first well-controlled test was presented in 1967 at the Transmission of Schizophrenia meeting, organized by Kety.

== Seymour Kety's legacy ==
Kety had three major contributions in three different areas. In psychiatry, Kety discovered the strong link between genetics and the staggering disease of schizophrenia. As a physiologist, Seymour studied cerebral circulation and made advancements in the field. Kety's work with neuroscience was also a large accomplishment.

Kety was a member of the American Academy of Arts and Sciences, the United States National Academy of Sciences, and the American Philosophical Society.

In 1981, Kety became a founding member of the World Cultural Council.

He never trained in psychiatry although he changed its course. In 1986, he was awarded the Ralph W. Gerard Prize in Neuroscience. In 1988 Kety and Louis Sokoloff were jointly awarded the NAS Award in the Neurosciences from the National Academy of Sciences. Kety also received awards from some of the most prestigious scientific groups, including the American Society of Arts and Sciences and the American Philosophical Association.
