= Luigi Galvani Medal =

The Luigi Galvani Medal is an award given by the Italian Chemical Society (Società Chimica Italiana). Named after pioneering Italian physicist Luigi Galvani, the prize was established in 1986 to recognize the work of foreign scientists in the field of electrochemistry.

== Recipients ==
A partial list of recipients is published by the Italian Chemical Society; others are referenced separately:

- 2015 Philip N. Bartlett (UK)
- 2011 Akira Fujishima (Japan)
- 2009 Michael Grätzel (Switzerland)
- 2007 Christian Amatore (France)
- 2004 Royce W. Murray (USA)
- 2002 Alejandro J. Arvi (Argentina)
- 2000 Dieter M. Kolb (Germany)
- 1998 Colin Vincent (UK)
- 1997 Jean-Michel Savéant (France)
- 1994 Marcel Pourbaix (Belgium)
- 1993 Roger Nicoll (USA)
- 1992 Allen J. Bard (USA)
- 1991 Brian E. Conway (Canada)
- 1988 Heinz Gerischer (Germany)
- 1986 Roger Parsons (UK)

== See also ==
- List of chemistry awards
