= List of fellows of the Royal Society elected in 1991 =

People elected Fellow of the Royal Society in 1991.

== Fellows ==
1. Paul Richard Adams
2. John Evan Baldwin (1931–2010)
3. Michael John Bevan
4. Kenneth Noel Corbett Bray
5. Peter Elwood Bryant
6. Robert Wolfgang Cahn (1924-2007)
7. John Lawrence Cardy
8. Brian Charlesworth
9. Bryan Randell Coles (1926-1997)
10. Thomas Michael Dexter
11. David Headley Green
12. Franklin Gerardus Grosveld
13. Nigel James Hitchin
14. Sir Tim Hunt
15. David Stewart Jenkinson (1928–2011)
16. Brian Frederick Gilbert Johnson
17. Philip Nicholas Johnson-Laird
18. Sir David King
19. Malcolm Douglas Lilly (1936-1998)
20. George Owen Mackie
21. Allan Roy Mackintosh (1936-1995)
22. Enid Anne Campbell MacRobbie
23. Michael David May
24. John Norman Murrell (1932–2016)
25. John Michael Newsom-Davis (d. 2007)
26. Kenneth John Packer
27. John Roundell Palmer (b.1940) 4th Earl of Selborne (Statute)
28. Gerald Pattenden
29. Graham Garland Ross
30. Charles Robert Scriver
31. Christopher Roland Somerville
32. Andrew Michael Soward
33. Govind Swarup
34. Stephen Austen Thorpe
35. Lap-Chee Tsui
36. Leslie Valiant
37. Martin Paterson Vessey
38. Richard Irving Walcott
39. Kenneth Walters
40. Michael Derek Waterfield
41. Colin Edward Webb

== Foreign members ==
1. Duilio Arigoni
2. Michael S Brown
3. Joseph L Goldstein
4. Hendrik Christoffel van de Hulst (1918-2000)
5. Claude Elwood Shannon (1916-2001)
6. John Wilder Tukey (1915-2000)
