= Heinrich Wieland Prize =

The Heinrich Wieland Prize is awarded annually by the Boehringer Ingelheim Foundation for outstanding research on biologically active molecules and systems in the areas of chemistry, biochemistry and physiology as well as their clinical importance.

In 1963, the Margarine Institute established the Heinrich Wieland Prize to support research in the field of lipids. In 2000, the Margarine Institute ended its sponsorship of the Prize and the pharmaceutical company Boehringer Ingelheim became the new sponsor. In 2011, the Boehringer Ingelheim Foundation took over the prize.

The awardee is selected by a scientific board of trustees. The prize is named after the Nobel Prize Laureate in chemistry Professor Heinrich Wieland (1877-1957), one of the leading lipid chemists of the first half of the 20th century. To mark its 50th anniversary in 2014, the prize money was raised to 100,000 euros.

Four of its awardees have gone on to receive the Nobel Prize: Michael S. Brown and Joseph L. Goldstein (1974), Bengt Samuelsson (1981) and James E. Rothman 1990.

== Prize winners ==
Source: Boehringer Ingelheim Foundation Heinrich Wieland Prize Laureates since 2020

- 1964: Ernst Klenk
- 1965: Wilhelm Stoffel
- 1966: no award presented
- 1967: Heinrich Wagener and Bruno Frosch
- 1968: David Adriaan van Dorp
- 1969: Werner Seubert
- 1970: Christian Bode and Harald Goebell
- 1971: Laurens L.M. van Deenen
- 1972: Heiner Greten and Kurt Oette
- 1973: Shosaku Numa
- 1974: Michael S. Brown and Joseph L. Goldstein
- 1975: Ernst Ferber and Klaus Resch
- 1976: Dietrich Seidel and Eckhart Schweizer
- 1977: Gerd Assmann and Helmut K. Mangold
- 1978: Olga Stein and Yechezkiel Stein
- 1979: Konrad Sandhoff
- 1980: H. Bryan Brewer and Barry Lewis
- 1981: Bengt Samuelsson
- 1982: Hansjörg Eibl and Robert William Mahley
- 1983: John M. Dietschy
- 1984: Olaf Adam and Gerhart Kurz
- 1985: Guy Ourisson
- 1986: Eugene P. Kennedy
- 1987: Akira Endo and Dietrich Keppler
- 1988: Lawrence C.B. Chan
- 1989: Ching-Hsien Huang
- 1990: James E. Rothman and Karel W. A. Wirtz
- 1991: Jan L. Breslow
- 1991: Wolfgang J. Schneider
- 1992: Lev D. Bergelson
- 1993: Walter Neupert
- 1994: Joachim Seelig
- 1995: Jean E. Schaffer and Dennis E. Vance
- 1996: Jeffrey M. Friedman
- 1997: Bruce M. Spiegelman
- 1998: Thomas E. Willnow
- 1999: Ernst Heinz
- 2000: Lewis Clayton Cantley
- 2001: Felix Wieland
- 2002: Stephen O'Rahilly
- 2003: David J. Mangelsdorf
- 2004: Raphael Mechoulam and Roger Nicoll
- 2005: Helen Hobbs
- 2006: Alois Fürstner
- 2007: Joachim Herz
- 2008: Markus Stoffel
- 2009: Steven Ley
- 2010: Nenad Ban
- 2011: Franz-Ulrich Hartl
- 2012: Carolyn R. Bertozzi
- 2013: Tony Kouzarides
- 2014: Reinhard Jahn
- 2015: Gero Miesenböck
- 2016: Peter G. Schultz
- 2017: Alexander Varshavsky
- 2018: Pascale Cossart
- 2019: Jens Claus Brüning
- 2020: Craig M. Crews
- 2021: Thomas Boehm
- 2022: Xiaowei Zhuang
- 2023: Matthias H. Tschöp

== See also ==
- List of chemistry awards
- List of prizes named after people
