= Andrew Soward =

British fluid dynamicist

Andrew Soward FRS
- Born: 20 October 1943
- Died: 20 July 2025 (aged 81)
- Education: University of Cambridge (BA, PhD)
- Awards: FRS (1991)
- Scientific career
- Fields: fluid dynamics
- Workplaces: University of Newcastle; University of Exeter
- Doctoral advisor: Keith Moffatt

Andrew Michael Soward FRS (20 October 1943- 20 July 2025) was a British fluid dynamicist. He was an emeritus professor at the Department of Mathematics of the University of Exeter.

== Education ==
Soward was educated at Queens' College, Cambridge. He earned his PhD in 1969, under the supervision of Keith Moffatt.

== Research ==
Soward is known for his work on magnetohydrodynamics (MHD) and especially dynamo theory, and also for his contributions to linear and nonlinear stability theory. He used asymptotic analysis to solve a number of outstanding problems in applied mathematics. By a new pseudo-Lagrangian technique for studying lightly damped fluid systems, he elucidated previously inexplicable features of Braginskii's geodynamo. Soward has provided explicit examples of steady fast dynamo action, thus disproving a conjecture that such dynamos did not exist.

He identified new rotating modes of nonlinear convection in rotating systems, and in collaboration with Steven Childress, established an MHD dynamo model in a rapidly rotating Bénard layer; he also gave the first demonstration that situations exist where oscillatory MHD dynamos generate magnetic fields more readily than steady flows can. He collaborated with Eric Priest to provide the first mathematically consistent account of the Petschek mechanism of magnetic field line reconnection. Soward also gave the first complete solution of the Stefan (freezing) problem in cylindrical geometry; with C.A. Jones, he provided the first completely correct solution of the spherical Taylor problem.

== Awards and honours ==
Soward was elected a Fellow of the Royal Society (FRS) in 1991.
