= Michigan State University Libraries =

Library system of a University

Coordinates: 42°43′51.68″N 84°29′0.93″W

- Location: East Lansing, Michigan, United States
- Branches: 9

Collection
- Size: 8,543,550 volumes 10,858,158 titles (2021 data)

Other information
- Director: Neil Romanosky
- Website: lib.msu.edu

Michigan State University Libraries (MSU Libraries) is the academic library system of Michigan State University in East Lansing, Michigan, United States. The library system comprises nine branch locations including the Main Library. As of 2021–22, the MSU Libraries ranked 26th among U.S. and Canadian research libraries by number of volumes (8,543,550 volumes) and 7th among U.S. and Canadian research libraries by number of titles held (10,858,158 titles).

The Africana Collection is one of the largest of its kind in the nation with a collection of over 200,000 items.

Other significant collections include the G. Robert Vincent Voice Library, the largest academic voice library in the nation, containing a collection of over 100,000 hours of spoken word recordings and includes the voices of over 500,000 persons from all walks of life, and the Russel B. Nye Popular Culture Collections which includes the extensive Comic Art Collection. This collection includes over 100,000 comic books, and 10,000 related books and periodicals. The Turfgrass Information Center is recognized as the most extensive public collection of turfgrass educational material in existence.

== Main Library branch collections ==
The Branch Libraries are subject collections located in the Main Library as well as in two branch libraries located in other buildings on campus. Each of the branch libraries have their own subject specialization.

Inside of MSU's Main Library Branch

Branch Libraries located inside the main library building include:

- Digital & Multimedia Center
- Music
- Art
- Maps
- Special Collections
- Turfgrass Information Center
- The Vincent Voice Library

Branch Libraries located outside the main library building include:

- Gast Business Library
- Schaefer Law Library

=== Africana ===
The Africana Collection of the MSU Library has become one of the largest in the United States, having been built up since 1960 to support the broad faculty involvement in different projects on the continent, including research and development.

In the last few years the MSU program about Africa has been consistently rated among the top one or two programs in the country, both the number of faculty involved and the number of doctoral dissertations produced. The Library has 2 full-time professional Africana librarians, both of them holding doctorates in African Studies, who provide reference assistance to a wide range of faculty and students at MSU and elsewhere. The librarians are also very involved in national cooperative projects.

The Library collection is roughly 270,000 books, pamphlets, maps and microform units covering all disciplines there is an emphasis on the socio-economic development and history of sub-Saharan Africa, with special emphases (reflecting faculty interests) on Ethiopia/Eritrea, Zimbabwe, South Africa, the Sahel region of West Africa, and Nigeria (especially the Eastern Region). Library materials come from all African countries (less so for North Africa) are collected at a high level and from all historical periods.

In 1999 it launched the open access African e-Journals Project (OCLC 216849920).

=== Cesar Chavez Collection ===
The Cesar E. Chavez Collection is an interdisciplinary browsing collection consisting of titles in a variety of formats, research levels and locations on Chicano and Boricua Studies. Chavez Collection materials in other locations require the storage, access/viewing facilities and services not available in an open shelves collection. The main part of this collection is located on the first floor, west wing lobby of the Main Library. This browsing collection is reinforced throughout the Libraries system by other titles in the main stacks collection and various branch collections.

The collection is representative of Chavez's life. It reflects his commitment to unions and labor, non-violence, truth, respect and an appreciation of diversity, education and his cultura. Chavez was a frequent visitor to the Lansing area, and as such, the collection also reflects the Midwest presence of migrant farmworkers.

=== Digital & Multimedia Center ===
Computer cubicles inside the Digital and Multimedia Center

The Digital and Multimedia Center is the MSU Library's internal digitization facility and media center. In addition to offering online collections, representing many books and journals digitized by DMC, a set of over 10,000 multimedia items are held and are available for check out. These include theatrical movies and video games that can be used in the DMC. DMC also assists in obtaining permissions from copyright holders for MSU faculty who need to use protected materials in courses and academic projects.

=== Music ===
The Music Library is located in the west wing of the Main Library on the fourth floor. It houses the collections for:

- Music (scores, recordings, books, periodicals, reference works and classical music, with strong collections in jazz and ethnomusicology.

=== Art Library ===
The Art Library is located on the third floor of the west wing of the Main Library. It houses art books and periodicals.

=== Government Documents ===
The Government Documents Library is the Main Library location for publications of the United States government, the Canadian government, the State of Michigan, the United Nations and many other international intergovernmental organizations. It contains over 3 million documents in paper, microformat, and electronic formats. A significant portion of the collection is presently uncataloged and, therefore, does not appear in the Libraries' catalog.

==== U.S. Government documents ====
The library has been a Federal Government Depository Library since 1907 and currently receives approximately 80 percent of the publications made available to depository libraries. An extensive range and variety of subjects are covered in the U.S. documents collection. It is particularly strong in the areas of agriculture, demography and population, education, environmental sciences, international relations, labor, and law. The collection is arranged by Superintendent of Documents call number which organizes publications by issuing agency rather than by subject.

There are over 7,000 serial titles, many of which are complete from early dates, including Foreign Relations of the United States from 1861, Geological Survey Professional Papers from 1896, U.S. Geological Survey Water-Supply Papers from 1902, and the Bulletin of the United States Bureau of Labor Statistics from 1913.

==== Canadian documents ====
In 1967, the library became a selective depository of Canadian federal documents to support the Canadian-American Studies Program. The library selects a general range of publications from science to foreign policy and labor relations. It is particularly strong in agriculture, demography and population, fisheries and wildlife, forestry, and history. The collection includes Canadian censuses, statutes, and proceedings and reports of the Canadian Parliament.

==== Michigan documents ====
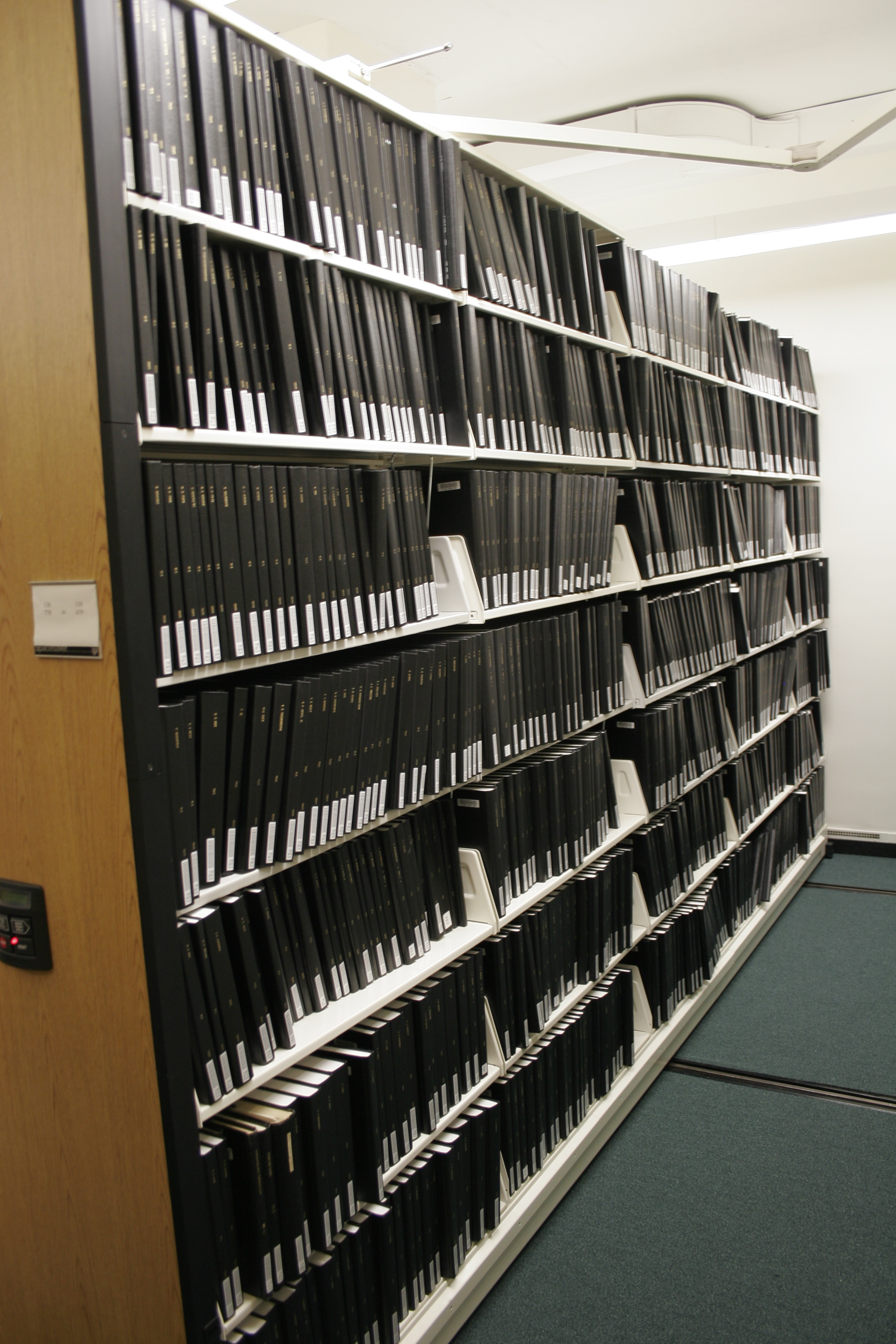
Stacks located in the Basement of Michigan State's Library

In 2007 the Library ended its status as a permanent Depository for official publications of the State of Michigan. All of the materials received including the House and Senate Journals, reports on a variety of subjects, statistical reports and annual reports of various state agencies are maintained in the Government Documents Library.

==== United Nations documents and publications ====
The collection includes documents and publications issued by the main United Nations organs since 1946. It also includes materials issued by various UN programs and bodies including, but not limited to, the UN Conference on Trade and Development, the UN Development Programme, UNICEF, UNRISD, UN University, and the UN Environment Programme.

The collection also contains publications issued by most of the UN specialized agencies and autonomous organizations. These include the Food and Agriculture Organization, General Agreement on Tariffs and Trade/World Trade Organization, International Fund for Agricultural Development, International Monetary Fund, International Telecommunication Union, United Nations Educational Scientific and Cultural Organization, United Nations Industrial Development Organization, World Bank Group, and the World Intellectual Property Organization. Materials issued by several UN specialized agencies (International Atomic Energy Agency, International Labour Organization, World Health Organization) are housed in the main stacks.

==== Other international intergovernmental organizations ====
The Government Documents Library also collects materials issued by other international intergovernmental organizations including, but not limited to, the European Union, Asian Development Bank, Organization of American States, Council of Europe, NATO, Association of South East Asian Nations, Western European Union, and the Organization for Economic Cooperation and Development.

=== Map Library ===
Inside the Map Library

The Map Library, located on the 2nd floor of the east wing of the Main Library, houses a collection of general and thematic maps and atlases for most areas of the world. The collection consists of approximately 200,000 sheet maps and 4,000 atlases, gazetteers and other reference aids including wall maps, globes, CDs and Internet-accessible resources. The collection is especially strong in Michigan topics, United States, Canada, Africa, Asia, and Latin America, though all areas are collected at some level.

The Brunnschweiler Geography Library Endowment Fund was established in 1993 by Dr. Tamara Brunnschweiler for the acquisition and preservation of geography materials. Purchases from this fund are often old and rare maps and atlases relating to the MSU Libraries' mission.

=== Rovi Media Collection ===
In 2015 the Rovi Corporation donated more than 850,000 movies, CDs and video games to the MSU Libraries, this collection is now the largest media collection in the United States. The archive consists of CDs that have been commercially available in the United States since the early 1990s and includes some releases imported from Europe. The DVD collection, which was started the year DVDs were introduced, similarly represents the vast majority of commercially released DVDs in the United States. The games archive focuses primarily on console games and PC from 1993 to 2014 and includes a few titles dating back to the early '80s. Some of the materials from the collection are available to the MSU community through the MSU Libraries catalog and to Michigan residents through MeLCat, the Michigan e-library catalog.

=== Turfgrass Information Center ===
The Turfgrass Information Center (TIC), a specialized unit at the Michigan State University Libraries (MSU), contains the most comprehensive publicly available collection of turfgrass educational materials in the world. TIC has over 250,000 records in its primary database, the Turfgrass Information File (TGIF).

In the 1960s, the Michigan State University (MSU) Library began to collect printed turfgrass materials. In 1968, the personal collection of the late O.J. Noer, pioneer turf agronomist, was added to the library holdings through the O.J. Noer Foundation. Later gifts have included the Noer/Milorganite® Image Collection (on indefinite loan), the Scotts Company Archive, and most significantly, the James B Beard Turfgrass Library Collection. Today, the combined collection is recognized as the most extensive public collection of turfgrass material in existence.

Between 1983 and 1992, the United States Golf Association (USGA) Turfgrass Research Program supported the development of the USGA Turfgrass Information File (TGIF). Using the Noer Collection as a foundation, TGIF was designed to systematically inventory published turf research and make the bibliographic information available via a computerized database. The TGIF database is accessible online through the Web. With over 250,000 searchable items using over 300,000 keywords, these resources cover the full scope of the turfgrass industry.

This database monitors over 1,000 journals and magazines, research reports, and conference proceedings. In addition, the database includes records for extension bulletins, books and book chapters, technical reports, theses and dissertations, web documents, published Q & As, scanned golf course plans, and video interviews.

=== Vincent Voice Library Collection ===
The G. Robert Vincent Voice Library, located within the Digital and Multimedia Library, is a collection of over 100,000 hours of spoken word recordings, dating back to 1888. The collection includes the voices of over 500,000 persons from all walks of life. Political and cultural leaders and minor players in the human drama are captured and catalogued to serve the research needs of a local, national and international user base. Clients include students and faculty of Michigan State University, other scholars and researchers, broadcasting networks, news agencies and film, video, and Web production companies. It is the largest academic voice library in the United States and is part of the Michigan State University Libraries.

=== The Murray and Hong Special Collections ===
The Special Collections Department of the Michigan State University Libraries collects, houses, and preserves rare and unique materials within the MSU Libraries. The Special Collections was formally established in 1962 with the charge to house special materials, as well as to build, preserve, and make accessible important research collections for educational use. In 2019 Dr. Keelung Hong donated the personal papers and research material of his spouse Dr. Stephen O. Murray, and in 2020 the name of the archive was changed to Stephen O. Murray and Keelung Hong Special Collections.

The materials cover a vast array of topics, but materials in Special Collections cannot be checked out, they can be used only in the Special Collections reading rooms. Today, the Special Collections holds over 450,000 printed works, numerous manuscript and archival collections, and an extensive collection of ephemera supporting research in popular culture, radicalism, comic art, and gender. Notable rare book collections include early veterinary medicine, eighteenth century British history and culture, modern American literature, cookery, and natural history. The Russel B. Nye Popular Culture Collection is one of the largest collections of its kind in the world while the Radicalism Collection features extensive holdings on a wide range of political, social, and economic viewpoints. The oldest printed book in the MSU Libraries is held in Special Collections. Its title is Scriptores Rei Rusticae, and was printed in Venice in 1482, only a short time after the invention of the moveable type printing press by Johannes Gutenberg in Germany about 1455.

==== Comic Art Collection ====
A Division or Branch of the Special Collections Department is The Comic Art Collection. The Comic Art Collection holds over 200,000 items. It is the largest library comic book collection in the world. While the bulk of the collection is made up of American comic books, it also includes over 1,000 books of collected newspaper comic strips, nearly 15,000 comics from other countries, and several thousand books and periodicals about the subject. The major focus of the collection is on collecting published work, in its effort to give a complete view of the 20th century. Comics are currently the largest and fastest-growing special collection at the MSU Libraries. Its coverage of comic strips was significantly enhanced with the donation in 2007 of the King Features proof sheet collection consisting of roughly one million sheets containing about two million individual strips (a duplicate set was donated to Ohio State University's Billy Ireland Cartoon Library & Museum). In addition, the same year retired Professor Richard Webster of the University of Toledo donated his collection of one million comic strips collected from around the world during the 1960s. The Comic Art Collection accepts unannounced donations. Materials not accepted into the collection are sent to another appropriate library or sold to support endowment funds for the Comic Art Collection.

All contents of the collection are listed in the MSU Libraries' online catalog as well as in the international OCLC computer network. Microfiche copies of several hundred extremely rare superhero comic books from the early 1940s are also available in the Special Collections reading room.

== Outside Main Library Building collections ==
These are included in the library catalog but physically located outside the Main Library. Branch Libraries located outside of the main library building include:

- William C. Gast Business Library
- John F. Schaefer Law Library

=== Business Library (William C. Gast) ===
The William C. Gast Business Library is located in Room 50 of the Law College Building across from the Eppley Center. It is the largest of the branches at MSU Libraries and has three business librarians, two support staff and twenty-five student employees The library provides seating for 450 and has wireless access as well as Internet connections at most tables, carrels and cubicles. There are group study rooms available, as well as cubicles for group use. Laser printing, including color, is available from the computers or laptops through e-token accounts. Room 22 serves as an instruction and computer lab with 28 seats. The branch is open 109 hours each week during the fall and spring semesters.

==== Labor & Industrial Relations Library ====
The Labor and Industrial Relations (LIR), collection is located in the Business Library and is open to the public. It consists of a non-circulating LIR Reference Collection on site, with access to the rest of the University Libraries’ system. Established in 1957, it is jointly funded and administered by the School of Labor and Industrial Relations and the MSU Libraries

Areas of strength in the LIR Reference Collection include labor and employment law, and grievance arbitration. There are also several information reporters and loose-leaf services for LR/HR information.

Unique among its holdings is the Michigan Public Sector Agreement Collection. In 1972 the LIR Library was designated by the Michigan Employment Relations Commission (MERC) to be the repository for Michigan public sector agreements. The current agreements are in the LIR Library and superseded agreements are in the University Archives.

=== John F. Schaefer Law Library ===
The MSU Law Library is administratively separate from other libraries on campus. It contains materials of use to students in the MSU College of law, but is also open to other MSU Students and the general public.

=== Closed branch libraries ===
This MSU branch library, also known as the Gull Lake Library, was part of Michigan State University's W.K. Kellogg Biological Station. The Gull Lake Library contained over 1,200 volumes, many of which are bound journal volumes. The collection supported the research interests of KBS faculty, staff, students and visiting scientists in aquatic and terrestrial ecology, evolution, behavior and agro-ecology. KBS is Michigan State University's largest off-campus education complex and one of North America's premier inland field stations.

The first director of the station, Dr. Walter F. Morofsky, was an entomologist with MSU. Historically, the library had a strong historical entomology collection. Early bird sanctuary research and teaching led to a good waterfowl collection. Once the year round research station was established in 1965, and the branch library was established, a strong research program in limnology was begun, which continues to this day. Currently, there are strong research programs in limnology, microbial ecology, plant ecology, agricultural ecology, fish ecology and vertebrate behavioral ecology.

The Gull Lake Library permanently closed in 2022.

== See also ==
- Category:United States federal depository libraries
- Fred Waring Cartoon Collection
- International Federation of Library Associations and Institutions
- Library of Congress Classification
- Library of Congress Subject Headings
- Library 2.0
- List of newspaper comic strips
- Open access (publishing)
- Public Library of Science
- Research library
