= Michael Dexter =

British haematologist

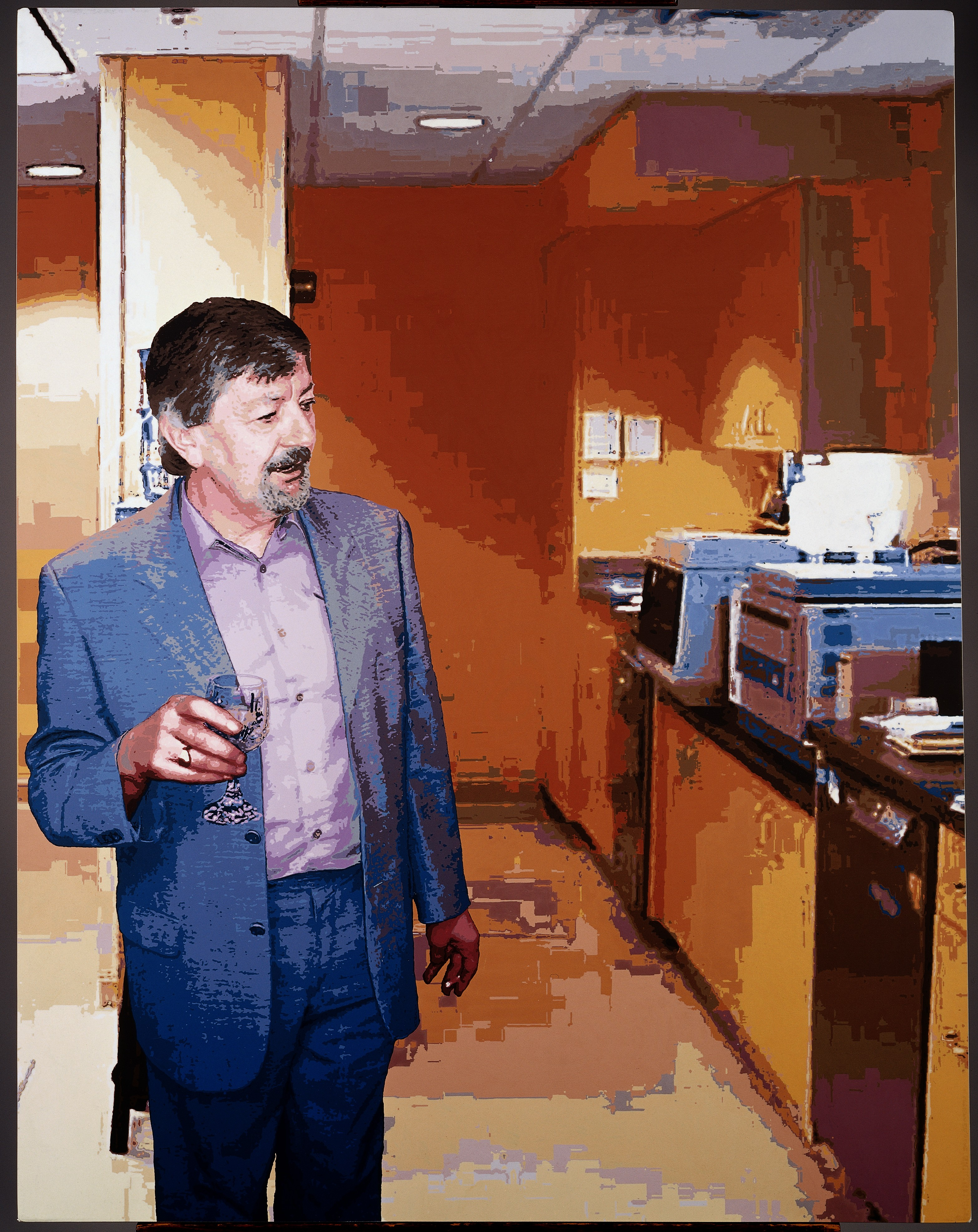
- Mike Dexter. Acrylic painting by Alex Dexter, 2003.
- Born: Thomas Michael Dexter; 15 May 1945 (age 81)
- Education: University of Salford (BSc); University of Manchester (PhD)
- Known for: Director of Wellcome Trust; Cancer research
- Awards: Fellow of the Royal Society (1991)
- Scientific career
- Fields: Haematology
- Workplaces: Wellcome Trust; University of Manchester; Paterson Institute for Cancer Research
- Thesis: Leukaemogenesis by the alkylating agent methylnitrosourea (1974)

(Thomas) Michael Dexter FRS (born 15 May 1945) is a British haematologist and director of the Wellcome Trust, from 1998 to 2003.

== Education ==
Dexter was inspired to take A levels at night school and went on study physiology and zoology at the University of Salford. After graduating, he continued in academia and received a PhD from the University of Manchester in 1974 for research into Leukemia. Dexter also received a Doctor of Science degree from the University of Salford in 1982.

== Career ==
Dexter was visiting fellow at the Memorial Sloan–Kettering Cancer Center and a professor of haematology at the University of Manchester from 1985 to 1998.

He was director of the Paterson Institute for Cancer Research and the Wellcome Trust. He has authored over 360 articles in scientific journals including Nature and is an editor of four books.

== Awards and honours ==
Dexter was elected a Fellow of the Royal Society (FRS) in 1991. He was founding fellow of the Academy of Medical Sciences (FMedSci) in 1998.

Preceded by Bridget Ogilvie	Director of Wellcome Trust; 1998–2008	Succeeded by Mark Walport
