= Louis Sokoloff =

American neuroscientist

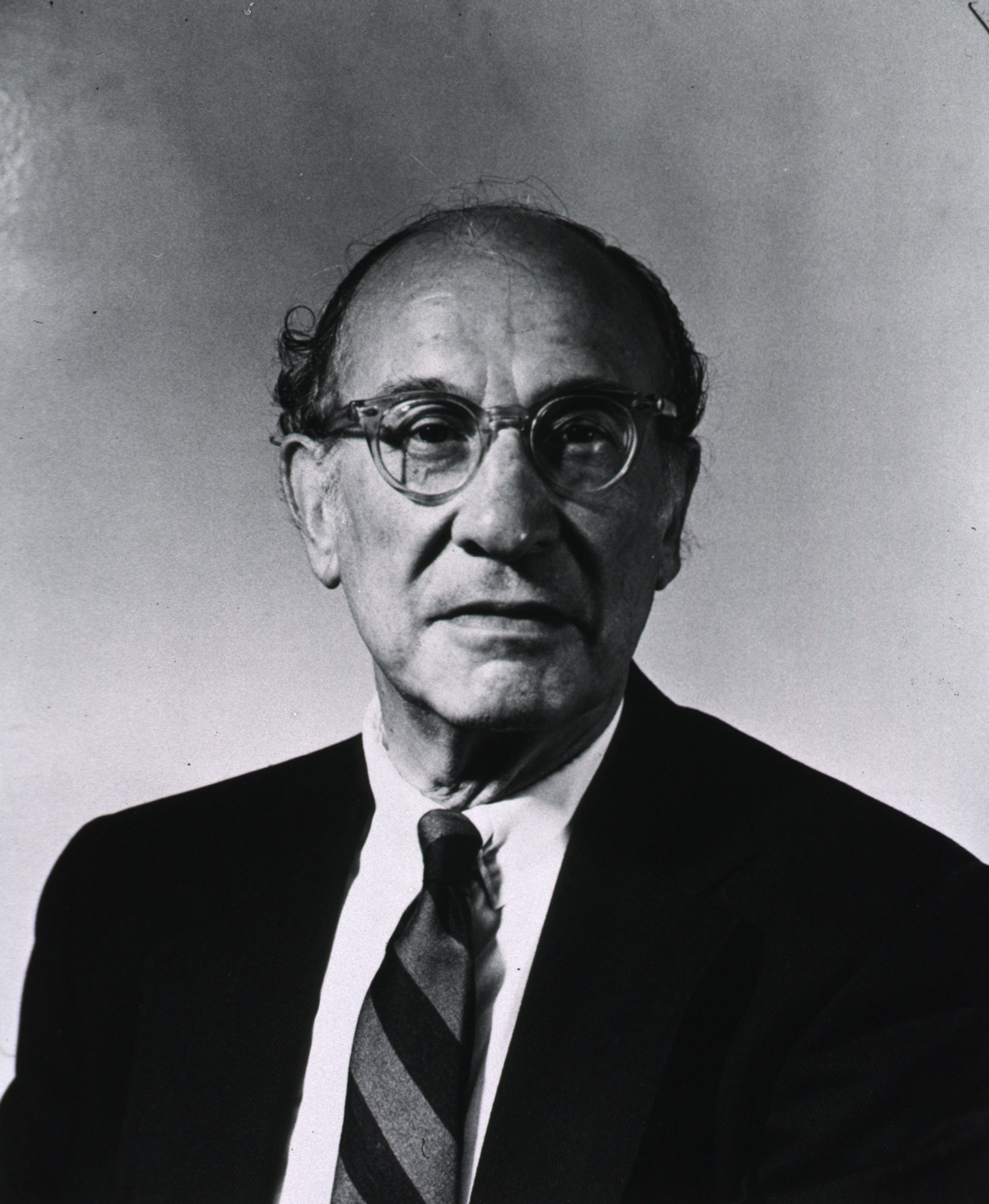
- Born: October 14, 1921
- Died: July 30, 2015 (aged 93)
- Scientific career
- Fields: Neuroscience

Louis Sokoloff (October 14, 1921 – July 30, 2015) was an American neuroscientist. He is considered to be a pioneer in functional imaging of the brain.

Louis Sokoloff was born in Philadelphia, Pennsylvania. He was a member of the National Academy of Sciences from 1980. In 1981, he received the Lasker-DeBakey Clinical Medical Research Award. In 1987, he received the Karl Spencer Lashley Award; "For his elucidation of the physiological and biochemical processes involved in the metabolism of the brain and the application of these discoveries to the measurement of functional activity within that organ". In 1988, Sokoloff, together with Seymour S. Kety received the NAS Award in the Neurosciences, "For developing techniques to measure brain blood flow and metabolism - valuable tools in the study of brain function that have major applications in clinical medicine." In 1996, he received the Ralph W. Gerard Prize in Neuroscience. He was elected to the American Philosophical Society in 2005. He died on July 30, 2015, in Washington, D.C. Many of his papers and biographical material are published as "The Sokoloff Papers" in Profiles in Science at the National Library of Medicine web site. (https://profiles.nlm.nih.gov/NL/)

His wife, Betty, was an RN, served in WWII and earned a pilot's license. His son, Kenneth Sokoloff, was an economic historian. He also had a daughter, Ann.
