= Kenneth Walters =

British mathematician (1934–2022)

- Born: 14 September 1934
- Died: 28 March 2022 (aged 87)
- Education: University of Swansea
- Awards: FRS (1991)
- Scientific career
- Fields: Fluid mechanics; rheology
- Workplaces: University of Aberystwyth
- Thesis: Some Elastico-Viscous Liquids with Continuous and Discrete Relaxation Spectra (1959)
- Doctoral advisor: James G. Oldroyd

Kenneth Walters FRS (14 September 1934 – 28 March 2022) was a British mathematician and rheologist. He was a Distinguished Research Professor at the Institute Of Mathematics, Physics and Computer Science of the Aberystwyth University.

== Education ==
Walters earned his PhD from the University of Swansea in 1959 under the supervision of James G. Oldroyd. His thesis was entitled Some Elastico-Viscous Liquids with Continuous and Discrete Relaxation Spectra.

== Work ==
Walters made contributions to rheology and the development of rheological science in the United Kingdom, and has conducted extensive studies of the behaviour of non-Newtonian fluids, particularly elastic liquids. He made advances in two major areas: the measurement of rheological properties, and the numerical solution of complex flows. In the first area, he extended the theory of viscometric flows, carried out a searching analysis of sources of error in the principal instruments in current use, and was involved in industrial applications arising in the manufacture of lubricants, detergents and paints. His book, Rheometry, is a standard work of reference and the book Numerical Simulation of Non-Newtonian Flow, of which he is joint author, is an influential text in this field of research.

== Awards and honours ==
Prof. Walters was recognized extensively for his contributions to the rheological community by being awarded the Gold Medal from the British Society of Rheology in 1984 and the Weissenberg Award from the European Society of Rheology in 2002. Walters was elected a Fellow of the Royal Society (FRS) in 1991. In 1995 he was made a Foreign Associate of the National Academy of Engineering. He was an active member of the rheological community for many years. He served as President of the British Society of Rheology from 1974 to 1976, President of the European Society of Rheology from 1996 to 2000, and the Chairman of the International Committee on Rheology from 2000 to 2004. He was a founding fellow of the Learned Society of Wales.

== Personal life ==
In 1961, Kenneth began dating Mary Eccles, an Aberystwyth student who had been Student ‘Rag Queen’ before they met. They were both committed Christians and married in 1963. Their mutual faith led them into lay leadership at St Michael's Anglican church in Aberystwyth. They had three children and seven grandchildren.

== Death ==
Walters' death was announced on 30 March 2022.
