= Jean E. Schaffer =

American cardiologist and scientist

Jean Elise Schaffer, MD
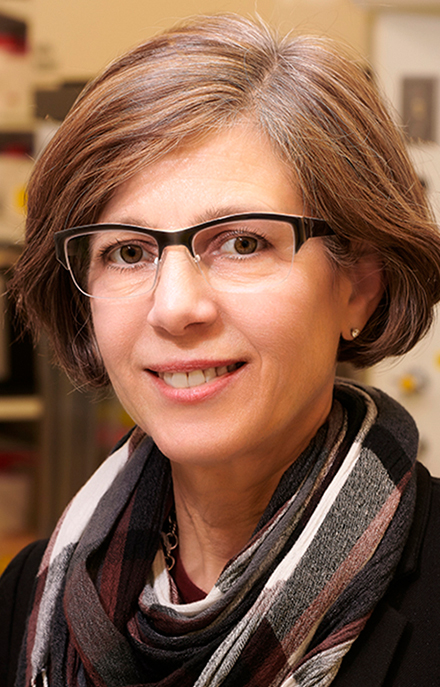
- Education: Harvard College (A.B.); Harvard Medical School (M.D.)
- Occupation: physician-scientist
- Website: https://www.schafferlab.org

Jean Elise Schaffer is an American physician-scientist. She is a Senior Investigator at the Joslin Diabetes Center, where she also serves as an Associate Research Director, and she is a Professor of Medicine at Harvard Medical School. Her work focuses on fundamental mechanisms of metabolic stress responses and the pathophysiology of diabetes complications.

== Education ==
Schaffer studied biochemistry at Harvard College, writing her undergraduate thesis with Richard I. Morimoto in the laboratory of Matthew Meselson. She earned her M.D. from Harvard Medical School. Schaffer completed an internship and residence in medicine at Brigham and Women's Hospital, and clinical and research fellowship in cardiology at Beth Israel Hospital. During her postdoctoral training with Harvey Lodish at the Whitehead Institute at Massachusetts Institute of Technology, she cloned the first member of the fatty acid transport protein family.

== Career ==
In 1995 Schaffer joined the faculty at Washington University School of Medicine in St Louis and in 2008 was appointed as the inaugural Virginia Minnich Distinguished Professor of Medicine. She directed the NIDDK-funded Diabetes Research Center at Washington University from 2008-2019. Her laboratory discovered that disruption of specific small nucleolar RNAs protects against lipid-induced cell death and alters metabolism, work that has provided a new understanding of how nutrient signals influence cellular homeostasis through non-coding RNAs. Schaffer’s contributions to lipid metabolism and metabolic stress have been recognized by American Society for Clinical Investigation, American Association for the Advancement of Science, Association of American Physicians and American Society for Biochemistry and Molecular Biology. In 2019 Schaffer moved to the Joslin Diabetes Center at Harvard Medical School.

== Awards and honors ==
- 1993: Katz Basic Science Research Prize, American Heart Association
- 1995: Heinrich Wieland Prize
- 2003: American Society for Clinical investigation
- 2008: Fellow of the American Association for the Advancement of Science
- 2012: Association American of Physicians
- 2017: Harold Rifkin Award, Albert Einstein College of Medicine
- 2018: Robert P. Hebbel Award, University of Minnesota
- 2020: Avanti Award in Lipids, American Society for Biochemistry and Molecular Biology
