= Walle Nauta =

Walle Jetze Harinx Nauta (June 8, 1916 – March 24, 1994) was a leading Dutch-American neuroanatomist, and one of the founders of the field of neuroscience. Nauta is best known for his silver staining, which helped to revolutionize neuroscience. He was an Institute Professor of neuroscience at MIT and also worked at the University of Utrecht, the University of Zurich, the Walter Reed Army Institute of Research, and the University of Maryland. In addition, he was a founder and president of the Society for Neuroscience.

== Early life ==
Nauta was born on June 8, 1916, in Medan, Sumatra, Dutch East Indies. His father had traveled there from the Netherlands as a missionary of the Dutch Reformed Church, but his focus quickly evolved into improving the overall education, health, and governance of the Indonesians. Growing up in a household that emphasized ideas of social justice and empathy toward others contributed to Nauta's character and actions as he grew into a young man in the midst of World War II. He is remembered as a man intolerant of others' personal entitlement and having a strong passion for helping his fellow man.

Nauta and his family returned to the Netherlands in the 1930s, and so escaped imprisonment during the Japanese occupation. It was there that Nauta finished his elementary schooling.

== Education and career ==
Nauta attended medical school at the University of Leiden from 1934 to 1941. Under the German occupation, the university was closed, and Nauta continued his education at the University of Utrecht, receiving his medical degree in 1942, where he also taught anatomy. That same year, Nauta married Ellie Plaat, a nurse who was also from the Dutch East Indies and became a practicing physician. At the same time, he conducted research at Utrecht, studying the effects of hypothalamic lesions on sleep in rats. The war also took a toll on Nauta's ability to access supplies for his lab. In one extreme case, he used his wife's breast milk to feed the rats, as she was nursing their first child at the time.

Shortly after Nauta and Plaat married, they took in and harbored a fifteen year old Jewish girl named Dina Dasberg. Dina stayed with the Nautas until the liberation of the city in May 1945.

After the war, Nauta continued his career specializing in anatomy. He accepted another teaching position at the University of Zurich. Here, Nauta became focused on creating a more efficient technique for tracing neural activity. He focused on the neural networks of the hypothalamus, a region in the brain that regulates certain metabolic processes among other activities of the autonomic nervous system. The experimental methods for identifying and tracing neural tracts at the time were ineffective when working with the neural circuits in the hypothalamus and other parts of the brain.

Nauta dedicated himself to creating a staining technique that would overcome the challenges brought on by previous methods, and after years of research, he pioneered a silver staining technique that would become known as the Nauta stain. This technique provided much higher resolution of neuroanatomical connectivity than was previously available. Nauta was assisted in understanding the mechanisms of his stain by Lloyd F. Ryan and Paul A. Gygax.

In 1951, Nauta moved to the United States. He worked as a neurophysiologist in the Division of Neuropsychiatry at the Walter Reed Army Institute of Research in Washington, D.C., from 1951 to 1964. After moving to the states, Nauta's first papers on neural connectivity carried out with his new silver staining technique began to appear. By this time, the Nauta staining technique was gaining popularity and remained the principal method of experimental neuroanatomy until the 1970s when more effective methods began to surface.

Nauta worked at the University of Maryland from 1955 to 1964 as a professor of anatomy. In 1964, he was appointed professor of neuroanatomy in the department of Psychology at MIT in 1964. In 1975, He was also appointed as a neuroanatomist on the staff of McLean Hospital in Belmont, Massachusetts.

In 1986, Nauta retired from MIT. His work included over a hundred papers for professional journals or books. Walle J. H. Nauta died March 24, 1994, at the age of 77, after being hospitalized with a blood infection.

== Research ==
Walle Nauta began his career in research with his doctoral thesis studying the effects of lesions in the hypothalamus on sleep in rats. He was awarded his PhD degree in 1945. His interest in the neural connections of the hypothalamus eventually inspired him to come up with and perfect the Nauta silver staining technique for which he is most well known.

In the years following the introduction of the Nauta staining method, Walle Nauta's research focused on using the stain to explore the neural connectivity in different regions of the brain. Papers he authored or contributed to included work on the distribution of the fornix, the connectivity of the amygdala and basal ganglia, and the spinothalamic tract.

As a professor, much of his later work was carried out with students. Nauta shifted his focus from the neuroanatomical structure of the brain, specifically the hypothalamus, to the motor system and its relationship with the limbic system.

=== The Nauta Silver Staining Technique ===
Anterograde degeneration in the nervous system, also known as Wallerian degeneration, is a process of deterioration down the axon of a nerve cell away from the cell body. This degeneration is the result of damage or injury to a nerve fiber, and it causes the affected fiber to appear “coagulated” or “curdled.” It was discovered by Ludwig Turck that anterograde degeneration can be used to trace axonal pathways in the nervous system. It was also found that the coagulated fragments produced by anterograde degeneration have a high affinity for impregnation by silver.

Silver staining techniques pioneered scientists' ability to study the structural elements of the brain. However, most of these methods impregnated normal axons with silver as well as the ones undergoing degeneration. Nauta's silver staining technique allows for a suppression of the silver impregnation of the normal axons and provides contrast between healthy and degenerating neural circuits. Nauta developed this stain through trial and error, using different combinations of oxidizing and reducing agents in the silver reduction phase. Nauta was assisted in the development of the staining process by Lloyd F. Ryan, a U.S. Air Force major, and Paul A. Gygax, a doctoral student in organic chemistry.

As the success of his stain began to gain popularity, the scientific community became increasingly optimistic about the neuroanatomical knowledge the technique could uncover. It was used in most neuroanatomy laboratories and became the primary method of experimental neuroanatomy until the 1970s, when other methods were shown to be more effective.

== Recognition and awards ==
Walle Nauta's contributions to neuroanatomical study revolutionized the way neural circuits were studied.

Nauta was a founding member of the Society for Neuroscience and one of its early presidents (1972–1973). He was also a member of the National Academy of Sciences, the American Philosophical Society, the American Association of Anatomists, and the American Neurological Association and the American Academy of Arts and Sciences. He was elected a corresponding member of the Royal Netherlands Academy of Arts and Sciences in 1978.

Nauta received many prestigious awards:

- Karl Spencer Lashley Award of the American Philosophical Society for Research in Neurobiology (1964)
- NAS Award in the Neurosciences from the National Academy of Sciences. (1967)
- Distinguished Research Award of the American Neurological Society (1975)
- Boylston Medical Society Award (1978)
- Von Helmholz Award of the Cognitive Neuroscience Institute (1983)
- Henry Gray Award of the American Association of Anatomists
- Ralph W. Gerard Prize in Neuroscience (Society for Neuroscience) (1983)
- Bristol-Myers Squibb Award for Distinguished Achievement in Neuroscience Research (1988)

== External references ==
- Walle Nauta—Biographical Memoirs of the National Academy of Sciences
- Yad Vashem's Righteous on Walle Nauta – his activity to save a Jewish woman's life during the Holocaust, at Yad Vashem website
