= Felix Wieland =

Felix T. Wieland
- Born: 1948 (age 77–78)
- Alma mater: LMU Munich; Max Planck Institute of Biochemistry
- Known for: COPI-coated vesicle formation Prokaryotic protein glycosylation Lipidomics
- Relatives: Heinrich Wieland (grandfather); Feodor Lynen (uncle); Theodor Wieland (uncle)
- Awards: Heinrich Wieland Prize (2001); Member of the Leopoldina (2003); Feldberg Foundation Prize (2006)
- Scientific career
- Fields: Biochemistry
- Workplaces: University of Regensburg; Heidelberg University
- Doctoral advisor: Feodor Lynen

Felix T. Wieland (born 1948) is a German biochemist and a senior professor at Heidelberg University. He served as president of the German Society for Biochemistry and Molecular Biology from 2005 to 2007 and was managing editor of the journal FEBS Letters from 2001 to 2021.

Wieland's research concerned the transport of proteins between cell compartments, the analysis of membrane lipids, and the interactions of lipids with proteins. He is an elected member of the German National Academy of Sciences Leopoldina, the European Molecular Biology Organization and the Academia Europaea.

== Early life and education ==
Wieland was born in 1948. He is a grandson of Heinrich Wieland and a nephew of Feodor Lynen and of Theodor Wieland.

He studied chemistry at LMU Munich from 1969 to 1975. Afterwards, he carried out doctoral research at the Max Planck Institute of Biochemistry in Martinsried under Lynen between 1975 and 1978.

== Career ==
Wieland moved to the University of Regensburg in 1978. There he held academic posts until 1986 and completed his habilitation in 1984. After meeting James Rothman in 1985, he spent a sabbatical in Rothman's laboratory at Stanford University from 1986 to 1988, working on the mechanisms of intracellular transport.

In 1988, he became a professor at Heidelberg University's Medical Faculty, and held the professorship until 2018, when he was appointed a senior professor of the university.

Wieland joined the editorial board of FEBS Letters in 1994 and was its managing editor from 2001 to 2021. He was president of the German Society for Biochemistry and Molecular Biology from 2005 to 2007.

== Research ==
In his early career, Wieland studied the relative arrangement of the two subunits of yeast fatty acid synthase, which is a large multienzyme complex, by combining antibody crosslinking with negative stain electron microscopy. Using this approach, he developed a three-dimensional model of the enzyme in 1978.

At Regensburg, Wieland worked with Manfred Sumper and Josef Lechner on the cell surface glycoprotein of the archaeon Halobacterium salinarum. Through the 1980s he and his colleagues reported the structures of its glycans and aspects of their biosynthesis, sequenced a gene encoding a glycosylated archaeal surface layer protein, and found that glycosylation determines the shape of the cells. In 1985, with Gerhard Paul and Sumper, he showed that the organism's flagellins are glycoproteins.

Working with James Rothman, Wieland measured the rate of bulk flow of newly made protein from the endoplasmic reticulum to the cell surface. Their laboratories developed the budding assay in which purified Golgi membranes and cytosol generate coated vesicles. Afterwards, his work focused on the COPI coat, which packages proteins into vesicles for transport between the Golgi apparatus and the endoplasmic reticulum. In 1999 he reported the reconstitution of COPI vesicle budding from a minimal set of purified components. Later with John Briggs, he produced a molecular model of the coat by using reconstituted vesicles.

Wieland, Britta Brügger, and Wolf-Dieter Lehmann developed a nano-electrospray mass spectrometric method for quantifying membrane lipids at low picomole amounts. Wieland and Brügger also examined how proteins and lipids interact in membranes, and, in 2012, reported that a single molecule of one specific species of sphingomyelin binds the transmembrane domain of the p24 coat subunit and regulates formation of the COPI coat.

== Awards ==
- 2000 - Elected member, European Molecular Biology Organization
- 2001 - Heinrich Wieland Prize, Boehringer Ingelheim Stiftung
- 2003 - Elected member, Leopoldina
- 2006 - Feldberg Foundation Prize
- 2011 - Elected member, Academia Europaea

== Selected publications ==
- Wieland, F.; Siess, E. A.; Renner, L.; Verfürth, C.; Lynen, F. (1978). "Distribution of yeast fatty acid synthetase subunits: three-dimensional model of the enzyme". Proceedings of the National Academy of Sciences. 75 (12): 5792–5796. Bibcode:1978PNAS...75.5792W. doi:10.1073/pnas.75.12.5792. PMC 393061. PMID 366602.
- Wieland, F.; Gleason, M.; Serafini, T.; Rothman, J. E. (1987). "The rate of bulk flow from the endoplasmic reticulum to the cell surface". Cell. 50 (2): 289–300. doi:10.1016/0092-8674(87)90224-8. PMID 3594573.
- Serafini, T.; Stenbeck, G.; Brecht, A.; Lottspeich, F.; Orci, L.; Rothman, J. E.; Wieland, F. T. (1991). "A coat subunit of Golgi-derived non-clathrin-coated vesicles with homology to the clathrin-coated vesicle coat protein beta-adaptin". Nature. 349 (6306): 215–220. doi:10.1038/349215a0. PMID 1898984.
- Brügger, B.; Erben, G.; Sandhoff, R.; Wieland, F. T.; Lehmann, W. D. (1997). "Quantitative analysis of biological membrane lipids at the low picomole level by nano-electrospray ionization tandem mass spectrometry". Proceedings of the National Academy of Sciences. 94 (6): 2339–2344. Bibcode:1997PNAS...94.2339B. doi:10.1073/pnas.94.6.2339. PMC 20089. PMID 9122196.
- Bremser, M.; Nickel, W.; Schweikert, M.; Ravazzola, M.; Amherdt, M.; Hughes, C. A.; Söllner, T. H.; Rothman, J. E.; Wieland, F. T. (1999). "Coupling of coat assembly and vesicle budding to packaging of putative cargo receptors". Cell. 96 (4): 495–506. doi:10.1016/S0092-8674(00)80654-6. PMID 10052452.
- Contreras, F. X.; Ernst, A. M.; Haberkant, P. (2012). "Molecular recognition of a single sphingolipid species by a protein's transmembrane domain". Nature. 481 (7382): 525–529. Bibcode:2012Natur.481..525C. doi:10.1038/nature10742. PMID 22230960.
