= Robert Vincent =

Robert Vincent may refer to:

- Robert Vincent (politician) (born 1956), Quebec politician
- Robert Vincent (musician) (born 1981), English blues and country music singer-songwriter
- Rob Vincent (born 1990), English footballer
- Robert Vincent (priest) (died 1765), Canadian clergy

== See also ==
- Robert Vincent Daniels (1926–2010), American historian and educator
- George Robert Vincent (1898–1985), sound recording and archiving pioneer
