= Bridget Ogilvie =

Australian medical researcher (1938–2026)

Dame Bridget Ogilvie AC DBE FRS
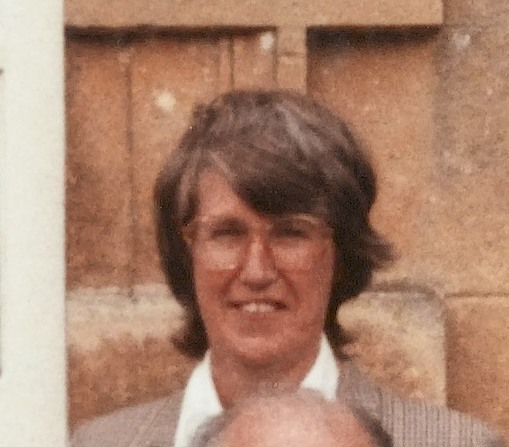
- Ogilvie in 1987
- Born: Bridget Margaret Ogilvie; 24 March 1938; Glen Innes, New South Wales, Australia
- Died: 27 April 2026 (aged 88)
- Education: University of Cambridge
- Awards: FRS; DBE; PhD
- Scientific career
- Workplaces: University of Cambridge; National Institute for Medical Research; Wellcome Trust; Zeneca Group plc Imperial College London
- Thesis: Nippostrongylus braziliensis: a study of the life cycle and immunological response of the host (1964)
- Website: www.st-edmunds.cam.ac.uk/people/dame-bridget-ogilvie

Dame Bridget Margaret Ogilvie AC DBE FRS (24 March 1938 – 27 April 2026) was an Australian and British parasitologist and scientist.

== Early life and education ==
Ogilvie was born in Glen Innes, New South Wales, Australia on 24 March 1938, to John Mylne and Margaret Beryl (née McRae) Ogilvie. During her primary school years, she had a single teacher, and three other students in her class.

She was educated at the New England Girls' School (Armidale, New South Wales), finishing in 1955. She completed a Bachelor of Rural Science degree with First Class Honours at the University of New England, graduating with the university medal in 1960. She was awarded a Commonwealth Scholarship to attend Girton College, Cambridge, where she earned a PhD degree for her work on Nippostrongylus brasiliensis.

== Career ==
Ogilvie joined the Parasitology department at the Medical Research Council's National Institute for Medical Research (NIMR) in 1963 and spent her academic career there studying immune responses to nematodes (intestinal worms) until 1981 when she was appointed to the staff of the Wellcome Trust, becoming its Director in 1991. She remained as Director until she retired in 1998. The key event during her Directorship was the establishment of the Sanger Institute at Hinxton near Cambridge, now the Wellcome Genome Campus.

At the end of her time at the Wellcome Trust, in 1998, she persuaded the government to join forces with the Wellcome Trust in funding the Joint Infrastructure Fund to improve university facilities for research.

She served on the main Board of Lloyds Bank, then Lloyds TSB bank. 1995–2000, and on the main Board of Zeneca, then AstraZeneca 1997–2006. She had many honorary degrees from universities in several countries and was the High Steward of the University of Cambridge from 2001 to 2009.

Ogilvie was the first Chairperson of the Medicines for Malaria Venture (MMV) Board. During her retirement, she played a significant role in public engagement with science and science in education. As a trustee of the Science Museum and chair of the AstraZeneca science teaching trust, she served as chair of COPUS and Techniquest. She served as the Vice Chair of the Board of Trustees of Sense about Science since its establishment and was a visiting professor at University College London.

== Death ==
Ogilvie died on 27 April 2026, at the age of 88.

== Awards and honours ==
In 1994, Ogilvie won the Kilgerran Prize of the Foundation for Science and Technology. In the 1996 New Year Honours List, Ogilvie was made a Dame Commander of the Order of the British Empire (DBE) and was an inaugural Fellow of the Academy of Medical Sciences in 1998 and was elected a Fellow of the Royal Society (FRS) in 2003.

In 2007, she was appointed a Companion of the Order of Australia (AC), Australia's highest civilian honour, with the citation: "For service to science in the field of biomedical research, particularly related to veterinary and medical parasitology, and through support for research funding to improve global health."

She was a member of the Advisory Council for the Campaign for Science and Engineering. In 2008 she was elected to the Australian Academy of Science. She was an Honorary Fellow of St Edmund's College, Cambridge. She was an honorary member of the British Society for Immunology. In 2016 the Wellcome Sanger Institute named their new sequencing operations building after her.

Preceded by Peter Williams	Director of Wellcome Trust; 1991–1998	Succeeded by Michael Dexter
