= NAS Award in the Neurosciences =

The NAS Award in the Neurosciences is awarded by the U.S. National Academy of Sciences "in recognition of extraordinary contributions to progress in the fields of neuroscience, including neurochemistry, neurophysiology, neuropharmacology, developmental neuroscience, neuroanatomy, and behavioral and clinical neuroscience." It was first awarded in 1988.

== Recipients ==
Source: National Academy of Sciences

- Liqun Luo (2025)

For advancing understanding of the mechanisms of neural development, neuronal diversity, and brain wiring.

- Nancy Kanwisher (2022)

For her groundbreaking insights into the functional organization of the human brain, including the discovery of neocortical subregions that differentially engage in the perception of faces, places, music and even what others think, thereby linking modularity of mind theories to neuroscience.

- Eve Marder (2019)

For her body of work that has transformed the perception of neuronal circuits as static structures well-described by connectivity diagrams, to our current understanding of microcircuits as flexible and dynamic entities that efficiently balance the needs for plasticity and stability.

- Mortimer Mishkin (2016)

For fundamental contributions to understanding the functional organization of the primate brain, including discovery of the visual functions of inferior temporal cortex, the role of the dorsal and ventral visual pathways in spatial and object processing, and anatomical descriptions of cognitive and non-cognitive memory systems.

- Solomon H. Snyder (2013)

For the elucidation of fundamental mechanisms of chemical signaling, including opiate receptors, NO signaling, and other neurotransmitter/receptor interactions.

- Roger A. Nicoll (2010)

For his seminal discoveries elucidating cellular and molecular bases for synaptic plasticity in the brain.

- Jean-Pierre Changeux (2007)

For the pioneering discovery that fast-acting neurotransmitters mediate their effects through allosteric regulation of the neurotransmitter protein.

- Brenda Milner (2004)

For her pioneering and seminal investigations of the functioning of the temporal lobes and other brain regions in learning, memory, and speech.

- Seymour Benzer (2001)

For his pioneering contributions which have brought neurogenetics to maturity. Benzer's discoveries in fruit flies have identified specific genes contributing to behaviors of central importance.

- Vernon B. Mountcastle (1998)

For his discovery of the columnar organization of the mammalian cerebral cortex and for original studies relating behavior to function of single cells in higher cortical areas.

- Walle J. H. Nauta (1994)

For development of a powerful method for determining connectivity among specific brain sites and thus establishing now-classical circuits in the limbic system.

- Paul Greengard (1991)

For his discovery of the central role played by neuronal phosphoproteins in normal brain function as well as in neuropsychiatric and related disorders.

- Seymour S. Kety and Louis Sokoloff (1988)

For developing techniques to measure brain blood flow and metabolism -- valuable tools in the study of brain function that have major applications in clinical medicine.

== See also ==
- List of neuroscience awards
