= Floyd Rector =

American physician

- Education
- Scientific career
- Fields: Nephrology
- Workplaces: UT Southwestern; UCSF Parnassus; National Institutes of Health

Floyd Rector is a nephrologist and emeritus professor of medicine.

Rector was recruited to UT Southwestern as a medical student by Donald Seldin. He did a fellowship at the NIH studying acid-base metabolism for two years before returning to the faculty at UTSW.

Rector was chief of the division of nephrology at UCSF Parnassus from 1973 to 1989, where he became chair of the department of medicine until 1995.

Rector was elected president of the American Society of Nephrology in 1976.

== See also ==
- Acid–base homeostasis
