= Roger Nicoll =

American neuroscientist

- Born: January 15, 1941; Camden, New Jersey, United States
- Education: Lawrence University (B.A.); University of Rochester School of Medicine (M.D.)
- Known for: Synaptic plasticity and neurotransmission research
- Awards: Gerard Prize (2014); Warren Alpert Prize (2014); Pasarow Award (2011); NAS Award in the Neurosciences (2010); Taylor Prize (2008); NIMH Merit Award (1987), (1997) & (2007); Gruber Prize (2006); Perl-UNC Prize (2006); Heinrich Wieland Prize (2004)
- Scientific career
- Fields: Biology, Neuroscience
- Workplaces: University of California, San Francisco
- Thesis: Integrative Mechanisms in the Olfactory Bulb (1971)
- Doctoral students: Hillel Adesnik

Roger A. Nicoll is an American neuroscientist at the University of California, San Francisco where he is professor of cellular and molecular pharmacology. His research has contributed significantly to understanding synaptic physiology and pharmacology, particularly synaptic plasticity.

== Biography ==
Nicoll was born, on January 15, 1941 to Canadian-born parents in Camden, and grew up in Princeton, New Jersey, where his father was a physicist at RCA. He was diagnosed with dyslexia at an early age.

== Education ==
He studied biology and chemistry at Lawrence University in Appleton, Wisconsin, before shifting to medical studies at University of Rochester School of Medicine.

Following his second year at medical school, Nicoll joined National Institute of Mental Health (NIMH) Neurophysiology director Gian Salmoraghi's lab at St. Elizabeths Hospital, in Washington, D.C. to study electrophysiology for a year. After earning his M.D at Rochester in 1968, he interned at University of Chicago Hospitals and Clinics.

== Career ==
Following his internship, Nicoll returned to the National Institutes of Health (NIH) as a researcher.

He obtained a position with the State University of New York in 1973, where he worked with John Eccles, whose book had influenced Nicoll's earlier decision to study using electrodes to record impulses from neurons. In 1975, he joined the faculty of the University of California, San Francisco.

His long-term research goal has been understanding how electrical activity re-configures brain connections. His work focuses on changes in nerve circuitry that may occur over time, a phenomenon known as plasticity, which has revealed new details of synaptic plasticity, and led contemporary knowledge of the basic mechanisms by which neurons communicate through neurotransmitters, in a process known as synaptic transmission.

Nicoll has served on the editorial board of the Journal of Physiology.

== List of awards and honors ==
- 1987, 1997 and 2007 National Institutes of Health MERIT Award
- 1989 Alden Spencer Award
- 1993 Luigi Galvani Medal
- 1994 Member of National Academy of Sciences
- 1998 Lucia Russell Briggs Distinguished Achievement Award, Lawrence University
- 1999 Bristol Myers Squibb Investigator
- 1999 Member of American Academy of Arts and Sciences
- 2004 Heinrich Wieland Prize
- 2006 Gruber Prize in Neuroscience
- 2006 Perl-UNC Prize in Neuroscience
- 2008 J. Allyn Taylor International Prize in Medicine, Robarts Research Institute.
- 2010 National Academy of Science - Neuroscience Award
- 2011 Robert J. and Claire Pasarow Foundation Medical Research Award
- 2011 Axelrod Prize - Society for Neuroscience
- 2012 Scolnick Prize for neuroscience - MIT
- 2014 Grass Lecture - Society for Neuroscience
- 2014 Ralph W. Gerard Prize in Neuroscience - Society for Neuroscience
- 2014 Warren Alpert Foundation Prize - Harvard University
