= Graham Ross (physicist) =

British theoretical physicist (1944–2021)

- Born: 1944; Aberdeen, Scotland
- Died: 31 October 2021 (aged 76–77)
- Education: University of Aberdeen (BSc); University of Durham (DPhil)
- Awards: Fellow of the Royal Society (1991); Dirac Medal of the IOP (2012)
- Scientific career
- Fields: Particle physics; Standard Model; Supersymmetry
- Workplaces: University of Oxford
- Doctoral advisor: Alan Martin
- Doctoral students: Brian Greene; Orfeu Bertolami

Graham Garland Ross FRS (1944 – 31 October 2021) was a Scottish theoretical physicist who was the Emeritus Professor of Physics at the University of Oxford and Emeritus Fellow of Wadham College.

== Career ==
Ross was known for constructing models of fundamental interactions and verifying them by experimentation. With others, while at the European Organization for Nuclear Research (CERN) in Geneva, he predicted that gluon radiation would generate collimated jets of particles in electron–positron annihilation, which subsequently established the existence of the gluon. He made contributions to the foundation of the perturbative treatment of quantum chromodynamics, applying it to high-energy processes and developing connections with the low-energy quark model. He developed predictions of unified models of the fundamental forces for polarised lepton scattering, for sin^{2}θ_{W}, for proton decay, and for inflationary cosmology. He discovered that in supersymmetric models, the electroweak symmetry can be broken by quantum effects, and he was among the first researchers to develop models based on this idea.

== Personal life ==
Ross died suddenly on 31 October 2021.

== Awards and honours ==
Ross was elected a Fellow of the Royal Society (FRS) in 1991. In 2012, he was given the Dirac Medal by the Institute of Physics for his theoretical work in developing both the Standard Model of fundamental particles and forces and theories beyond the Standard Model that have led to many new insights into the origins and nature of the universe.
