= George Vincent =

George Vincent may refer to:

- George Vincent (MP) (1493c. –1566), member of parliament for Leicestershire Parliamentary constituency
- George Vincent (painter) (1796–c.1832), English painter
- George Edgar Vincent (1864–1941), American academic
- George R. Vincent (1841–1910), Wisconsin physician and legislator of the Greenback Party
- George Robert Vincent (1898–1985), sound recording pioneer
- George Frederick Vincent (1855–1928), English organist and composer
