= Joseph L. Goldstein =

American biochemist

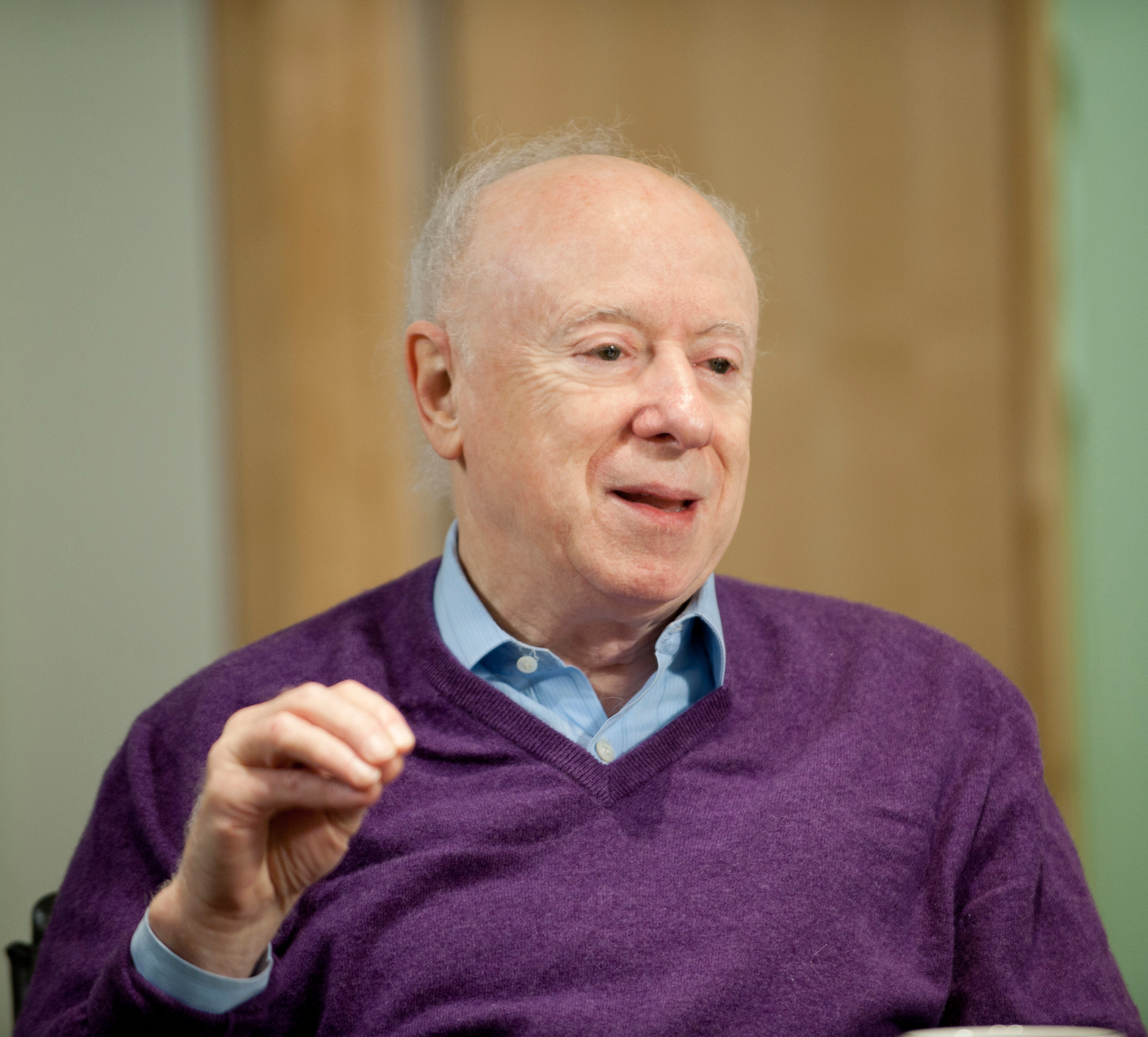
- Born: Joseph Leonard Goldstein; April 18, 1940 (age 86); Kingstree, South Carolina, U.S
- Education: Washington and Lee University; University of Texas Southwestern Medical Center
- Known for: Cholesterol
- Awards: Heinrich Wieland Prize (1974); Richard Lounsbery Award (1979); Louisa Gross Horwitz Prize (1984); Nobel Prize in Physiology or Medicine (1985); William Allan Award (1985); National Medal of Science (1988)
- Scientific career
- Fields: Biochemistry
- Workplaces: University of Texas Southwestern Medical Center
- Website: profiles.utsouthwestern.edu/profile/12645/joseph-goldstein.html

Joseph Leonard Goldstein ForMemRS (born April 18, 1940) is an American biochemist. He received the Nobel Prize in Physiology or Medicine in 1985, along with fellow University of Texas Southwestern researcher, Michael Brown, for their studies regarding cholesterol. They discovered that human cells have low-density lipoprotein (LDL) receptors that remove cholesterol from the blood and that when LDL receptors are not present in sufficient numbers, individuals develop hypercholesterolemia and become at risk for cholesterol related diseases, notably coronary heart disease. Their studies led to the development of statin drugs.

== Life and career ==
Goldstein was born in Kingstree, South Carolina, the son of Fannie (Alpert) and Isadore E. Goldstein, who owned a clothing store. His family is Jewish. Goldstein received his BSci from Washington and Lee University in 1962, and his MD from the University of Texas Southwestern Medical School in 1966. Upon completion of his residency, Goldstein moved to the National Institutes of Health (NIH) in Bethesda, Maryland, where he worked in biochemical genetics. In 1972, Goldstein relocated back to the Southwestern Medical Center, accepting a post as the head of the Division of Medical Genetics.

At the Southwestern Medical Center Goldstein collaborated extensively with Michael Brown, a fellow researcher at the center who had also worked at the NIH. From 1973 to 1985, Goldstein and Brown together published over one hundred major papers. They are both listed in Thomson Reuters’ index of highly cited authors. Frequently mentioned as a candidate for nationally prominent positions in scientific administration, Goldstein, like his colleague Michael Brown, chose to continue hands-on research.

In 1993, their postdoctoral trainees, Wang Xiaodong and Michael Briggs, purified the Sterol Regulatory Element-Binding Proteins (SREBPs), a family of membrane-bound transcription factors. Since 1993, Goldstein, Brown, and their colleagues have described the unexpectedly complex machinery that proteolytically releases the SREBPs from membranes, thus allowing their migration to the nucleus where they activate all the genes involved in the synthesis of cholesterol and fatty acids. The machinery for generating active SREBPs is tightly regulated by a negative feedback mechanism, which explains how cells maintain the necessary levels of fats and cholesterol in the face of varying environmental circumstances.

Goldstein is chair, Molecular Genetics at University of Texas Southwestern Medical Center. Together, Goldstein and Brown lead a research team that typically includes a dozen doctoral and postdoctoral trainees. They have trained over 145 graduate students and postdoctoral fellows, and six of their former postdoctoral fellows (Thomas C. Südhof, Wang Xiaodong, Helen H. Hobbs, David W. Russell, Monty Krieger, and Russell DeBose-Boyd) have been elected to the U.S. National Academy of Sciences. Former postdoctoral fellow Thomas C. Südhof received the 2013 Nobel Prize in Medicine or Physiology and Helen H. Hobbs received the 2015 Breakthrough Prize in Life Sciences.

In 1988 Goldstein received a National Medal of Science in the field of molecular genetics, and in 2003 Goldstein and Brown won the Albany Medical Center Prize in Medicine and Biomedical Research in recognition for their further work in understanding cholesterol and also the discovery of an insulin-sensitive regulator, which potentially could be used to develop treatments for diabetes mellitus. Goldstein is a member of the U.S. National Academy of Sciences and the Institute of Medicine and he was elected a Foreign Member of the Royal Society (ForMemRS) in 1991.

Goldstein was appointed as chairman of the Albert Lasker Medical Research Awards jury in 1995, and was a recipient of the award ten years earlier. Since 2000, Goldstein has authored a series of essays on the deep relationship between art and science that appear in the annual Nature Medicine supplement that accompanies the Lasker Awards.

Among his professional activities, Goldstein is a member of the Board of Trustees of The Howard Hughes Medical Institute and of The Rockefeller University, where he was elected as a Life Trustee in 2015. He also serves as chairman of the Board of Scientific Counselors of the Broad Institute, and is a member of the Board of Directors of Regeneron Pharmaceuticals, Inc. He previously served on The Board of Scientific Governors of the Scripps Research Institute, a nonprofit institute that conducts biomedical research.

== Awards ==
Joseph L. Goldstein has been awarded the following:

- 2011 – Stadtman Distinguished Scientist Award, American Society for Biochemistry and Molecular Biology
- 2007 – Builders of Science Award, Research!America
- 2005 – Woodrow Wilson Awards for Public Service
- 2005 – Herbert Tabor Award, American Society for Biochemistry and Molecular Biology
- 2003 – Albany Medical Center Prize in Medicine and Biomedical Research
- 2002 – Kober Medal, Association of American Physicians
- 1999 – Warren Alpert Foundation Prize, Harvard Medical School
- 1991 – Elected a Foreign Member of the Royal Society (ForMemRS)
- 1988 – U.S. National Medal of Science
- 1987 – Elected member of the American Philosophical Society
- 1986 – Golden Plate Award of the American Academy of Achievement
- 1985 – Nobel Prize in Physiology or Medicine
- 1985 – Albert Lasker Award for Basic Medical Research
- 1985 – William Allan Award, American Society of Human Genetics
- 1984 – Louisa Gross Horwitz Prize, Columbia University
- 1981 – Gairdner Foundation International Award
- 1981 – Elected member of the American Academy of Arts and Sciences
- 1980 – Elected member of the National Academy of Sciences
- 1979 – Richard Lounsbery Award, U.S. National Academy of Sciences
- 1978 – Passano Award, Johns Hopkins University
- 1976 – Pfizer Award in Enzyme Chemistry, American Chemical Society

== Research papers ==
- Brown MS, Goldstein JL (June 2012). "Reflections – Scientific side trips: six excursions from the beaten path". J. Biol. Chem. 287 (27): 22418–22435. doi:10.1074/jbc.X112.381681. PMC 3391146. PMID 22584575.
- Brown MS, Goldstein JL (May 2011). "Richard G.W. Anderson (1940–2011) and the birth of receptor-mediated endocytosis". J. Cell Biol. 193 (4): 601–603. doi:10.1083/jcb.201104136. PMC 3166872. PMID 21576388.
- Goldstein JL, Brown MS (April 2009). "History of Discovery: The LDL Receptor". Arterioscler. Thromb. Vasc. Biol. 29 (4): 431–438. doi:10.1161/ATVBAHA.108.179564. PMC 2740366. PMID 19299327.
- Brown MS, Goldstein JL (April 2009). "Cholesterol feedback: from Schoenheimer's bottle to Scap's MELADL". J. Lipid Res. 50 (Supplement): S15–S27. doi:10.1194/jlr.R800054-JLR200. PMC 2674699. PMID 18974038.
- Brown MS, Goldstein JL (October 2004). "A tribute to Akira Endo, discoverer of a "penicillin" for cholesterol". Atherosclerosis Supplements. 5 (3): 13–16. doi:10.1016/j.atherosclerosissup.2004.08.007.
- Brown MS, Goldstein JL (April 1986). "A receptor-mediated pathway for cholesterol homeostasis". Science. 232 (4746): 34–47. Bibcode:1986Sci...232...34B. doi:10.1126/science.3513311. PMID 3513311.
- Brown MS, Goldstein JL (March 1974). "Familial hypercholesterolemia: defective binding of lipoproteins to cultured fibroblasts associated with impaired regulation of 3-hydroxy-3-methylglutaryl coenzyme A reductase activity". Proceedings of the National Academy of Sciences of the United States of America. 71 (3): 788–792. Bibcode:1974PNAS...71..788B. doi:10.1073/pnas.71.3.788. PMC 388099. PMID 4362634.
- Goldstein JL, Brown MS (October 1973). "Familial hypercholesterolemia: identification of a defect in the regulation of 3-hydroxy-3-methylglutaryl coenzyme A reductase activity associated with overproduction of cholesterol". Proceedings of the National Academy of Sciences of the United States of America. 70 (10): 2804–2808. Bibcode:1973PNAS...70.2804G. doi:10.1073/pnas.70.10.2804. PMC 427113. PMID 4355366.

== Essays on "The Art of Science" ==
Since 2000, Goldstein has authored a series of essays considering science as a creative pursuit, and explores the links between art and science. The essays have appeared in the journals Nature Medicine, Cell, and most recently, PNAS. They coincide with the annual announcement of the Lasker Awards, with which Goldstein is affiliated in the capacity of jury chairman. A collection of Goldstein's essays titled The Art of Science was published in 2023.

- Joseph L. Goldstein (September 26, 2023). "The secret to a successful career in science--according to Magritte". PNAS. 120 (39) e2304819120. Bibcode:2023PNAS..12004819G. doi:10.1073/pnas.2304819120. PMC 10523505. PMID 37732754.
- Joseph L. Goldstein (September 2022). "The art and science of building castles in the sky and houses of cards that don't collapse". Cell. 185 (21): 3839–3843. doi:10.1016/j.cell.2022.08.027. PMID 36174577.
- Joseph L. Goldstein (September 2021). "The surprise element: A hallmark of creativity in scientists, artists, and comedians". Cell. 184 (21): 5261–5265. doi:10.1016/j.cell.2021.08.007. PMID 34562364.
- Joseph L. Goldstein (September 2020). "The Spanish 1918 Flu and the COVID-19 Disease: The Art of Remembering and Foreshadowing Pandemics". Cell. 183 (2): 285–289. doi:10.1016/j.cell.2020.09.030. PMC 7560262. PMID 33064981.
- Joseph L. Goldstein (September 2019). "Seurat's Dots: A Shot Heard 'Round the Art World—Fired by an Artist, Inspired by a Scientist". Cell. 179 (1): 46–50. doi:10.1016/j.cell.2019.07.051. PMID 31519312.
- Joseph L. Goldstein (September 2018). "What Makes a Piece of Art or Science a Masterpiece?". Cell. 175 (1): 1–5. doi:10.1016/j.cell.2018.08.026. PMID 30217357.
- Joseph L. Goldstein (September 2017). "Artists Create Puzzles, Scientists Solve Them". Cell. 171 (1): 5–9. doi:10.1016/j.cell.2017.08.022. PMID 28888326.
- Joseph L. Goldstein (September 2016). "The Rule of Three for Prizes in Science and the Bold Triptychs of Francis Bacon". Cell. 167 (1): 5–8. doi:10.1016/j.cell.2016.08.040. PMID 27634320.
- Joseph L. Goldstein (September 2015). "A Well-Hung Horse: Sired by Knowledge and Imagination". Cell. 162 (6): 1179–1182. doi:10.1016/j.cell.2015.08.039. PMID 26359973.
- Joseph L. Goldstein (October 2014). "Balzac's Unknown Masterpiece: spotting the next big thing in art and science". Nature Medicine. 20 (10): 1106–1111. doi:10.1038/nm.3676. PMID 25295945. S2CID 3558056.
- Joseph L. Goldstein (October 2013). "Juxtapositions in Trafalgar Square: tip-offs to creativity in art and science". Nature Medicine. 19 (10): 1222–1226. doi:10.1038/nm.3329. PMID 24100991. S2CID 22189523.
- Joseph L. Goldstein (October 2012). "Paradigm shifts in science: insights from the arts". Nature Medicine. 18 (10): 1473–1477. doi:10.1038/nm.2923. PMID 23042355. S2CID 27954297.
- Joseph L. Goldstein (October 2011). "The card players of Caravaggio, Cézanne and Mark Twain: tips for getting lucky in high-stakes research". Nature Medicine. 17 (10): 1201–1205. doi:10.1038/nm.2465. PMID 21989010. S2CID 26830785.
- Joseph L. Goldstein (October 2010). "How to win a Lasker? Take a close look at Bathers and Bulls". Nature Medicine. 16 (10): 1091–1096. doi:10.1038/nm1010-1091. PMID 20930751. S2CID 31919299.
- Joseph L. Goldstein (October 2009). "Lasker Awards and papal portraiture: turning fields upside down". Nature Medicine. 15 (10): 1137–1140. doi:10.1038/nm1009-1137. PMID 19812573. S2CID 26946901.
- Joseph L. Goldstein (October 2008). "Exuberant unpredictability: sine qua non for priceless and prizeworthy biomedical research". Nature Medicine. 14 (10): 1029–1032. doi:10.1038/nm1008-1029. PMID 18841142. S2CID 36086102.
- Joseph L. Goldstein (October 2007). "Creation and revelation: two different routes to advancement in the biomedical sciences". Nature Medicine. 13 (10): 1151–1154. doi:10.1038/nm1642. PMID 17917663. S2CID 29403975.
- Joseph L. Goldstein (October 2006). "Venture science: climbing the ladder to telomerase, cognitive therapy and in situ hybridization". Nature Medicine. 12 (10): 1129–1132. doi:10.1038/nm1006-1129. PMID 17024207. S2CID 5938083.
- Joseph L. Goldstein (October 2005). "60 years of winged victories for biomedical research". Nature Medicine. 11 (10): 1023–1025. doi:10.1038/nm1005-1023. PMID 16211026. S2CID 33375813.
- Joseph L. Goldstein (October 2004). "Towering science: an ounce of creativity is worth a ton of impact". Nature Medicine. 10 (10): 1015–1017. doi:10.1038/nm1004-1015. PMID 15459692. S2CID 35721266.
- Joseph L. Goldstein (October 2003). "It's a grand year for celebrating science". Nature Medicine. 9 (10): 1237–1238. doi:10.1038/nm937. PMID 14520362. S2CID 5661980.
- Joseph L. Goldstein (October 2002). "Synergy and symbiosis à la Matisse-Picasso". Nature Medicine. 8 (10): 1053–1054. doi:10.1038/nm768. PMID 12357230. S2CID 30056843.
- Joseph L. Goldstein (October 2001). "Knockout mice and test-tube babies". Nature Medicine. 7 (10): 1079–1080. doi:10.1038/nm1001-1079. PMID 11590416. S2CID 2396219.

== See also ==
- List of Jewish Nobel laureates
