= Paul Adams (scientist) =

British neuroscientist

Paul Adams FRS
- Education: Cambridge University
- Scientific career
- Fields: Biology, neuroscience
- Workplaces: State University of New York at Stony Brook
- Doctoral advisor: Juan Quilliam

Paul Richard Adams, FRS is a neuroscientist currently serving as a professor in the Department of Neurobiology and Behavior at Stony Brook University in New York.

He graduated from London University with a PhD, and did postdoctoral work with Bert Sakmann at the Max Planck Institute. He won the Novartis Memorial Prize in 1979 and the Gaddum Memorial Award in 1984, both from the British Pharmacological Society. He was made a MacArthur Foundation Prize Fellow in 1986, and elected as a Fellow of the Royal Society in 1991. From 1987 to 1995 he was an investigator at the Howard Hughes Medical Institute.

With others, he pioneered the concepts of open channel block and neuromodulation, which now play central roles in neuroscience. He is now working on a theory about the neocortex, centering on the idea that sophisticated learning requires extremely specific synaptic strength adjustments. He (working with Kingsley Cox) has proposed that this problem could be overcome, in the neocortex, by a process called “Hebbian proofreading”, using some neurons (e.g. in layer 6) as detectors of correlated activity between other neurons (e.g. in thalamus and upper layers), which then edit recent plasticity at the corresponding thalamocortical synapses.

== Patents ==
- Neuromorphic Device for Proofreading Connection Adjustments in Hardware Artificial Neural Networks
