= Charlotte Vincent =

British choreographer and artistic director

Charlotte Vincent is a British choreographer and the artistic director of Vincent Dance Theatre.

Vincent founded the Vincent Dance Theatre in Sheffield in 1994. It is an Arts Council England National Portfolio Organisation for 2018–22, allocated grants of £249,999 in each of the four years, and is an Associate Company of Brighton Dome.

In an Observer review of the company's 21st-anniversary residency at Shoreditch Town Hall in 2015, Luke Jennings said: "Funny, fearless and flintily determined, Vincent inspires unshakable loyalty in her dancers, and is one of the most important feminist artists working in Britain today. Contemporary dance fans should beat a path to her door."

In 2019 Vincent created her first installation piece, Virgin Territory a "multi-screen dance film installation" which "asks vital questions about responsibility as we witness children playing in an adult online world", in the Towner Art Gallery, Eastbourne.
