= Joseph Charles Aub =

American endocrinologist

Joseph Charles Aub (1890-1973) was an American endocrinologist and professor then chair of medicine at Harvard University. He graduated from Harvard College and Harvard Medical School.

The lead industry funded Aub's research which ignored the health effects of lead on children.

== Honours and awards ==
=== Foreign honours ===
- Czechoslovakia: Officer of the Order of the White Lion (1946)
