= Michael Stuart Brown =

American geneticist and Nobel laureate (born 1941)

Michael Brown ForMemRS
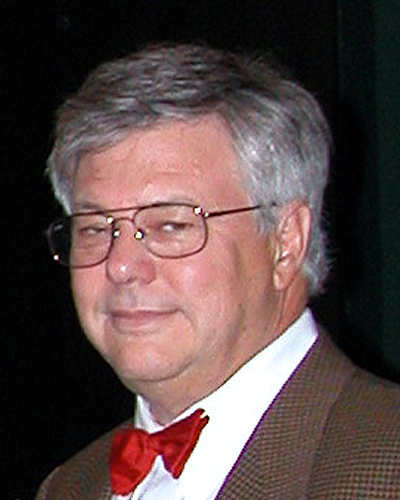
- Born: Michael Stuart Brown; April 13, 1941 (age 85); Brooklyn, New York, U.S.
- Education: University of Pennsylvania; University of Pennsylvania School of Medicine
- Known for: Regulation of cholesterol metabolism
- Spouse: Alice Lapin (m. 1964)
- Children: two
- Awards: Heinrich Wieland Prize (1974); Richard Lounsbery Award (1979); Louisa Gross Horwitz Prize (1984); William Allan Award (1985); Nobel Prize in Physiology or Medicine (1985); National Medal of Science (1988)
- Scientific career
- Fields: Biology
- Website: profiles.utsouthwestern.edu/profile/10894/michael-brown.html

Michael Stuart Brown ForMemRS NAS AAA&S APS (born April 13, 1941) is an American geneticist and Nobel laureate. He was awarded the Nobel Prize in Physiology or Medicine with Joseph L. Goldstein in 1985 for describing the regulation of cholesterol metabolism.

== Early life and education ==
Brown was born in Brooklyn, New York, on April 13, 1941, the son of Evelyn, a homemaker, and Harvey Brown, a textile salesman. His family is Jewish. He graduated from Cheltenham High School in Wyncote, Pennsylvania. Brown graduated from the University of Pennsylvania in 1962 and received his M.D. from the University of Pennsylvania School of Medicine in 1966.

== Career ==
Moving to the University of Texas Health Science Center in Dallas, now the UT Southwestern Medical Center, Brown and colleague Joseph L. Goldstein researched cholesterol metabolism and discovered that human cells have low-density lipoprotein (LDL) receptors that extract cholesterol from the bloodstream. The lack of sufficient LDL receptors is implicated in familial hypercholesterolemia, which predisposes heavily for cholesterol-related diseases. In addition to explaining the underlying pathology of this disease, their work uncovered a fundamental aspect of cell biology - receptor-mediated endocytosis. Their findings led to the development of statin drugs, the cholesterol-lowering compounds that today are used by 16 million Americans and are the most widely prescribed medications in the United States. Their discoveries are improving more lives every year, both in the US and around the world. New federal cholesterol guidelines will triple the number of Americans taking statin drugs to lower their cholesterol, reducing the risk of heart disease and stroke for countless people. Following these important advances, their team of dedicated researchers elucidated the role of lipid modification of proteins (protein prenylation) in cancer. In 1984 he was awarded the Louisa Gross Horwitz Prize from Columbia University together with Joseph L. Goldstein (co-recipient of 1985 Nobel Prize in Physiology or Medicine). In 1988, Brown received the National Medal of Science for his contributions to medicine.

In 1993, their trainees Xiaodong Wang and Michael Briggs purified the sterol regulatory element binding proteins (SREBPs). Since 1993, Brown, Goldstein, and their colleagues have described the unexpectedly complex machinery by which cells maintain the necessary levels of fats and cholesterol in the face of varying environmental circumstances.

Brown holds the W. A. (Monty) Moncrief Distinguished Chair in Cholesterol and Arteriosclerosis Research; is a Regental Professor of the University of Texas; holds the Paul J. Thomas Chair in Medicine.

B

== Awards and honors ==
Brown has won numerous awards and honors, including:

- 2016 - Keynote Speaker at the Congress of Future Medical Leaders
- 2011 - Stadtman Distinguished Scientist Award, American Society for Biochemistry and Molecular Biology
- 2007 - Builders of Science Award, Research!America
- 2005 - Woodrow Wilson Award for Public Service
- 2005 - Herbert Tabor Award, American Society for Biochemistry and Molecular Biology
- 2003 - Albany Medical Center Prize
- 2002 - Kober Medal, Association of American Physicians
- 1999 - Warren Alpert Foundation Prize, Harvard Medical School
- 1991 - Elected a Foreign Member of the Royal Society (ForMemRS)
- 1987 - Elected member of the American Philosophical Society
- 1986 - Golden Plate Award of the American Academy of Achievement
- 1985 - Nobel Prize for physiology and medicine
- 1985 - Albert Lasker Award for Basic Medical Research
- 1985 - William Allan Award, American Society of Human Genetics
- 1984 - Louisa Gross Horwitz Prize (Columbia University)
- 1981 - Gairdner Foundation International Award
- 1981 - Elected member of the American Academy of Arts and Sciences
- 1980 - elected member of the National Academy of Sciences
- 1979 - Lounsbery Award, U.S. National Academy of Sciences
- 1978 - Passano Award, Johns Hopkins University
- 1976 - Pfizer Award in Enzyme Chemistry, American Chemical Society
- 1974 - Heinrich Wieland Prize

== Bibliography ==
- Brown MS, Goldstein JL (July 1974). "Expression of the familial hypercholesterolemia gene in heterozygotes: mechanism for a dominant disorder in man". Science. 185 (4145): 61–3. Bibcode:1974Sci...185...61B. doi:10.1126/science.185.4145.61. PMID 4366052. S2CID 31493564.
- Brown MS, Goldstein JL (November 1975). "Regulation of the activity of the low density lipoprotein receptor in human fibroblasts". Cell. 6 (3): 307–16. doi:10.1016/0092-8674(75)90182-8. PMID 212203. S2CID 28312936.
- Goldstein JL, Basu SK, Brunschede GY, Brown MS (January 1976). "Release of low density lipoprotein from its cell surface receptor by sulfated glycosaminoglycans". Cell. 7 (1): 85–95. doi:10.1016/0092-8674(76)90258-0. PMID 181140. S2CID 23110979.
- Brown MS, Goldstein JL (January 1976). "Receptor-mediated control of cholesterol metabolism". Science. 191 (4223): 150–4. Bibcode:1976Sci...191..150B. doi:10.1126/science.174194. PMID 174194.
- Goldstein JL, Sobhani MK, Faust JR, Brown MS (October 1976). "Heterozygous familial hypercholesterolemia: failure of normal allele to compensate for mutant allele at a regulated genetic locus". Cell. 9 (2): 195–203. doi:10.1016/0092-8674(76)90110-0. PMID 184960. S2CID 26944871.
- Brown MS, Goldstein JL (December 1976). "Analysis of a mutant strain of human fibroblasts with a defect in the internalization of receptor-bound low density lipoprotein". Cell. 9 (4 PT 2): 663–74. doi:10.1016/0092-8674(76)90130-6. PMID 189940. S2CID 6706608.
- Anderson RG, Brown MS, Goldstein JL (March 1977). "Role of the coated endocytic vesicle in the uptake of receptor-bound low density lipoprotein in human fibroblasts". Cell. 10 (3): 351–64. doi:10.1016/0092-8674(77)90022-8. PMID 191195. S2CID 25657719.
- Goldstein JL, Brown MS, Stone NJ (November 1977). "Genetics of the LDL receptor: evidence that the mutations affecting binding and internalization are allelic". Cell. 12 (3): 629–41. doi:10.1016/0092-8674(77)90263-X. PMID 200368. S2CID 13211975.
- Anderson RG, Goldstein JL, Brown MS (1977). "A mutation that impairs the ability of lipoprotein receptors to localise in coated pits on the cell surface of human fibroblasts". Nature. 270 (5639): 695–9. Bibcode:1977Natur.270..695A. doi:10.1038/270695a0. PMID 201867. S2CID 4152556.
- Anderson RG, Vasile E, Mello RJ, Brown MS, Goldstein JL (November 1978). "Immunocytochemical visualization of coated pits and vesicles in human fibroblasts: relation to low density lipoprotein receptor distribution". Cell. 15 (3): 919–33. doi:10.1016/0092-8674(78)90276-3. PMID 215316. S2CID 35345591.
- Goldstein JL, Anderson RG, Brown MS (June 1979). "Coated pits, coated vesicles, and receptor-mediated endocytosis". Nature. 279 (5715): 679–85. Bibcode:1979Natur.279..679G. doi:10.1038/279679a0. PMID 221835. S2CID 4353842.
- Mello RJ, Brown MS, Goldstein JL, Anderson RG (July 1980). "LDL receptors in coated vesicles isolated from bovine adrenal cortex: binding sites unmasked by detergent treatment". Cell. 20 (3): 829–37. doi:10.1016/0092-8674(80)90329-3. PMID 6251975. S2CID 23996668.
- Brown MS, Kovanen PT, Goldstein JL (May 1981). "Regulation of plasma cholesterol by lipoprotein receptors". Science. 212 (4495): 628–35. Bibcode:1981Sci...212..628B. doi:10.1126/science.6261329. PMID 6261329.
- Basu SK, Goldstein JL, Anderson RG, Brown MS (May 1981). "Monensin interrupts the recycling of low density lipoprotein receptors in human fibroblasts". Cell. 24 (2): 493–502. doi:10.1016/0092-8674(81)90340-8. PMID 6263497. S2CID 29553611.
- Tolleshaug H, Goldstein JL, Schneider WJ, Brown MS (October 1982). "Posttranslational processing of the LDL receptor and its genetic disruption in familial hypercholesterolemia". Cell. 30 (3): 715–24. doi:10.1016/0092-8674(82)90276-8. PMID 6291781. S2CID 30013697.
- Basu SK, Goldstein JL, Brown MS (February 1983). "Independent pathways for secretion of cholesterol and apolipoprotein E by macrophages". Science. 219 (4586): 871–3. Bibcode:1983Sci...219..871B. doi:10.1126/science.6823554. PMID 6823554.
- Brown MS, Anderson RG, Goldstein JL (March 1983). "Recycling receptors: the round-trip itinerary of migrant membrane proteins". Cell. 32 (3): 663–7. doi:10.1016/0092-8674(83)90052-1. PMID 6299572. S2CID 34919831.
- Tolleshaug H, Hobgood KK, Brown MS, Goldstein JL (March 1983). "The LDL receptor locus in familial hypercholesterolemia: multiple mutations disrupt transport and processing of a membrane receptor". Cell. 32 (3): 941–51. doi:10.1016/0092-8674(83)90079-X. PMID 6299582. S2CID 39955408.
- Larkin JM, Brown MS, Goldstein JL, Anderson RG (May 1983). "Depletion of intracellular potassium arrests coated pit formation and receptor-mediated endocytosis in fibroblasts". Cell. 33 (1): 273–85. doi:10.1016/0092-8674(83)90356-2. PMID 6147196. S2CID 22848187.
- Orci L, Brown MS, Goldstein JL, Garcia-Segura LM, Anderson RG (April 1984). "Increase in membrane cholesterol: a possible trigger for degradation of HMG CoA reductase and crystalloid endoplasmic reticulum in UT-1 cells". Cell. 36 (4): 835–45. doi:10.1016/0092-8674(84)90033-3. PMID 6705048. S2CID 24586649.
- Chin DJ, Gil G, Russell DW, et al. (1984). "Nucleotide sequence of 3-hydroxy-3-methyl-glutaryl coenzyme A reductase, a glycoprotein of endoplasmic reticulum". Nature. 308 (5960): 613–7. Bibcode:1984Natur.308..613C. doi:10.1038/308613a0. PMID 6546784. S2CID 4308995.
- Russell DW, Schneider WJ, Yamamoto T, Luskey KL, Brown MS, Goldstein JL (June 1984). "Domain map of the LDL receptor: sequence homology with the epidermal growth factor precursor". Cell. 37 (2): 577–85. doi:10.1016/0092-8674(84)90388-X. PMID 6327078. S2CID 29839468.
- Reynolds GA, Basu SK, Osborne TF, et al. (August 1984). "HMG CoA reductase: a negatively regulated gene with unusual promoter and 5' untranslated regions". Cell. 38 (1): 275–85. doi:10.1016/0092-8674(84)90549-X. PMID 6088070. S2CID 11644830.
- Yamamoto T, Davis CG, Brown MS, et al. (November 1984). "The human LDL receptor: a cysteine-rich protein with multiple Alu sequences in its mRNA". Cell. 39 (1): 27–38. doi:10.1016/0092-8674(84)90188-0. PMID 6091915. S2CID 25822170.
- Lehrman MA, Schneider WJ, Südhof TC, Brown MS, Goldstein JL, Russell DW (January 1985). "Mutation in LDL receptor: Alu-Alu recombination deletes exons encoding transmembrane and cytoplasmic domains". Science. 227 (4683): 140–6. Bibcode:1985Sci...227..140L. doi:10.1126/science.3155573. PMC 4449727. PMID 3155573.
- Südhof TC, Goldstein JL, Brown MS, Russell DW (May 1985). "The LDL receptor gene: a mosaic of exons shared with different proteins". Science. 228 (4701): 815–22. Bibcode:1985Sci...228..815S. doi:10.1126/science.2988123. PMC 4450672. PMID 2988123.
- Südhof TC, Russell DW, Goldstein JL, Brown MS, Sanchez-Pescador R, Bell GI (May 1985). "Cassette of eight exons shared by genes for LDL receptor and EGF precursor". Science. 228 (4701): 893–5. Bibcode:1985Sci...228..893S. doi:10.1126/science.3873704. PMID 3873704.
- Gil G, Faust JR, Chin DJ, Goldstein JL, Brown MS (May 1985). "Membrane-bound domain of HMG CoA reductase is required for sterol-enhanced degradation of the enzyme". Cell. 41 (1): 249–58. doi:10.1016/0092-8674(85)90078-9. PMID 3995584. S2CID 22530611.
- Lehrman MA, Goldstein JL, Brown MS, Russell DW, Schneider WJ (July 1985). "Internalization-defective LDL receptors produced by genes with nonsense and frameshift mutations that truncate the cytoplasmic domain". Cell. 41 (3): 735–43. doi:10.1016/S0092-8674(85)80054-4. PMID 3924410. S2CID 27773467.
- Osborne TF, Goldstein JL, Brown MS (August 1985). "5' end of HMG CoA reductase gene contains sequences responsible for cholesterol-mediated inhibition of transcription". Cell. 42 (1): 203–12. doi:10.1016/S0092-8674(85)80116-1. PMID 3860301. S2CID 37319421.
- Brown MS, Goldstein JL (1985). "Scavenger cell receptor shared". Nature. 316 (6030): 680–1. doi:10.1038/316680a0. PMID 4033768. S2CID 4349775.
- Brown MS, Goldstein JL (April 1986). "A receptor-mediated pathway for cholesterol homeostasis". Science. 232 (4746): 34–47. Bibcode:1986Sci...232...34B. doi:10.1126/science.3513311. PMID 3513311.
- Davis CG, Lehrman MA, Russell DW, Anderson RG, Brown MS, Goldstein JL (April 1986). "The J.D. mutation in familial hypercholesterolemia: amino acid substitution in cytoplasmic domain impedes internalization of LDL receptors". Cell. 45 (1): 15–24. doi:10.1016/0092-8674(86)90533-7. PMID 3955657. S2CID 8147673.
- Yamamoto T, Bishop RW, Brown MS, Goldstein JL, Russell DW (June 1986). "Deletion in cysteine-rich region of LDL receptor impedes transport to cell surface in WHHL rabbit". Science. 232 (4755): 1230–7. Bibcode:1986Sci...232.1230Y. doi:10.1126/science.3010466. PMC 4451858. PMID 3010466.
- Lehrman MA, Goldstein JL, Russell DW, Brown MS (March 1987). "Duplication of seven exons in LDL receptor gene caused by Alu-Alu recombination in a subject with familial hypercholesterolemia". Cell. 48 (5): 827–35. doi:10.1016/0092-8674(87)90079-1. PMID 3815525. S2CID 35887205.
- Südhof TC, Russell DW, Brown MS, Goldstein JL (March 1987). "42 bp element from LDL receptor gene confers end-product repression by sterols when inserted into viral TK promoter". Cell. 48 (6): 1061–9. doi:10.1016/0092-8674(87)90713-6. PMID 3030558. S2CID 42788737.
- Davis CG, Goldstein JL, Südhof TC, Anderson RG, Russell DW, Brown MS (1987). "Acid-dependent ligand dissociation and recycling of LDL receptor mediated by growth factor homology region". Nature. 326 (6115): 760–5. Bibcode:1987Natur.326..760D. doi:10.1038/326760a0. PMID 3494949. S2CID 4347695.
- Hofmann SL, Russell DW, Brown MS, Goldstein JL, Hammer RE (March 1988). "Overexpression of low density lipoprotein (LDL) receptor eliminates LDL from plasma in transgenic mice". Science. 239 (4845): 1277–81. Bibcode:1988Sci...239.1277H. doi:10.1126/science.3344433. PMID 3344433.
- Reiss Y, Goldstein JL, Seabra MC, Casey PJ, Brown MS (July 1990). "Inhibition of purified p21ras farnesyl:protein transferase by Cys-AAX tetrapeptides". Cell. 62 (1): 81–8. doi:10.1016/0092-8674(90)90242-7. PMID 2194674. S2CID 30887422.
- Yokode M, Hammer RE, Ishibashi S, Brown MS, Goldstein JL (November 1990). "Diet-induced hypercholesterolemia in mice: prevention by overexpression of LDL receptors". Science. 250 (4985): 1273–5. Bibcode:1990Sci...250.1273Y. doi:10.1126/science.2244210. PMID 2244210.
- Seabra MC, Reiss Y, Casey PJ, Brown MS, Goldstein JL (May 1991). "Protein farnesyltransferase and geranylgeranyltransferase share a common alpha subunit". Cell. 65 (3): 429–34. doi:10.1016/0092-8674(91)90460-G. PMID 2018975. S2CID 54388220.
- Chen WJ, Andres DA, Goldstein JL, Russell DW, Brown MS (July 1991). "cDNA cloning and expression of the peptide-binding beta subunit of rat p21ras farnesyltransferase, the counterpart of yeast DPR1/RAM1". Cell. 66 (2): 327–34. doi:10.1016/0092-8674(91)90622-6. PMID 1855253. S2CID 36722957.
- Seabra MC, Brown MS, Slaughter CA, Südhof TC, Goldstein JL (September 1992). "Purification of component A of Rab geranylgeranyl transferase: possible identity with the choroideremia gene product". Cell. 70 (6): 1049–57. doi:10.1016/0092-8674(92)90253-9. PMID 1525821. S2CID 26223659.
- Brown MS, Goldstein JL (October 1992). "Koch's postulates for cholesterol". Cell. 71 (2): 187–8. doi:10.1016/0092-8674(92)90346-E. PMID 1423585. S2CID 33048207.
- Andres DA, Seabra MC, Brown MS, et al. (June 1993). "cDNA cloning of component A of Rab geranylgeranyl transferase and demonstration of its role as a Rab escort protein". Cell. 73 (6): 1091–9. doi:10.1016/0092-8674(93)90639-8. PMID 8513495. S2CID 26120573.
- Yokoyama C, Wang X, Briggs MR, et al. (October 1993). "SREBP-1, a basic-helix-loop-helix-leucine zipper protein that controls transcription of the low density lipoprotein receptor gene". Cell. 75 (1): 187–97. doi:10.1016/S0092-8674(05)80095-9. PMID 8402897. S2CID 2784016.
- Garcia CK, Goldstein JL, Pathak RK, Anderson RG, Brown MS (March 1994). "Molecular characterization of a membrane transporter for lactate, pyruvate, and other monocarboxylates: implications for the Cori cycle". Cell. 76 (5): 865–73. doi:10.1016/0092-8674(94)90361-1. PMID 8124722. S2CID 22137883.
- Wang X, Sato R, Brown MS, Hua X, Goldstein JL (April 1994). "SREBP-1, a membrane-bound transcription factor released by sterol-regulated proteolysis". Cell. 77 (1): 53–62. doi:10.1016/0092-8674(94)90234-8. PMID 8156598. S2CID 44899129.
- Sakai J, Duncan EA, Rawson RB, Hua X, Brown MS, Goldstein JL (June 1996). "Sterol-regulated release of SREBP-2 from cell membranes requires two sequential cleavages, one within a transmembrane segment". Cell. 85 (7): 1037–46. doi:10.1016/S0092-8674(00)81304-5. PMID 8674110. S2CID 6130686.
- Hua X, Nohturfft A, Goldstein JL, Brown MS (November 1996). "Sterol resistance in CHO cells traced to point mutation in SREBP cleavage-activating protein". Cell. 87 (3): 415–26. doi:10.1016/S0092-8674(00)81362-8. PMID 8898195. S2CID 1963192.
- Brown MS, Goldstein JL (May 1997). "The SREBP pathway: regulation of cholesterol metabolism by proteolysis of a membrane-bound transcription factor". Cell. 89 (3): 331–40. doi:10.1016/S0092-8674(00)80213-5. PMID 9150132. S2CID 17882616.
- DeBose-Boyd RA, Brown MS, Li WP, Nohturfft A, Goldstein JL, Espenshade PJ (December 1999). "Transport-dependent proteolysis of SREBP: relocation of site-1 protease from Golgi to ER obviates the need for SREBP transport to Golgi". Cell. 99 (7): 703–12. doi:10.1016/S0092-8674(00)81668-2. PMID 10619424.
- Brown MS, Ye J, Rawson RB, Goldstein JL (February 2000). "Regulated intramembrane proteolysis: a control mechanism conserved from bacteria to humans". Cell. 100 (4): 391–8. doi:10.1016/S0092-8674(00)80675-3. PMID 10693756. S2CID 12194770.
- Nohturfft A, Yabe D, Goldstein JL, Brown MS, Espenshade PJ (August 2000). "Regulated step in cholesterol feedback localized to budding of SCAP from ER membranes". Cell. 102 (3): 315–23. doi:10.1016/S0092-8674(00)00037-4. PMID 10975522. S2CID 18054832.
- Yang T, Espenshade PJ, Wright ME, et al. (August 2002). "Crucial step in cholesterol homeostasis: sterols promote binding of SCAP to INSIG-1, a membrane protein that facilitates retention of SREBPs in ER". Cell. 110 (4): 489–500. doi:10.1016/S0092-8674(02)00872-3. PMID 12202038. S2CID 15052132.

== See also ==
- List of Jewish Nobel laureates
