= Colin Vincent =

British electrochemist

- Education: University of Glasgow
- Awards: Galvani Medal (1998)
- Scientific career
- Fields: Electrochemistry
- Workplaces: University of Glasgow University of Illinois at Urbana-Champaign St Andrews University

Colin Angus Vincent, OBE, FRSE, is a British electrochemist with a specific interest in high energy batteries. He attended Oban High School and Glasgow University where he was medallist in Chemistry and graduated with a Bachelor of Science degree, a Ph.D. and later a D.Sc. During his academic career he has held posts at the University of Glasgow and the University of Illinois at Urbana-Champaign. Chiefly, though, he was Master and Deputy Principal at St Andrews University, with a spell as Acting Vice-Chancellor.

Starting his St Andrews career on a one-year research fellowship in 1966, Professor Vincent climbed the ranks to become Head of School of Chemistry from 1990 until 1996. He was Master of the United College at St Andrews from 1996 until his retirement in 2003.

Professor Vincent is a Member of the Institute of Electrical Engineers and a Fellow of the Royal Society of Chemistry and of the Royal Society of Edinburgh. He was awarded the Galvani Medal in 1998. He was made an Officer of the Order of the British Empire in the 2003 New Year Honours List.
