= George Robert Vincent =

American audio engineer (1898–1985)

George Robert Vincent (July 17, 1898 – November 13, 1985) was an American audio engineer and a pioneer in the field of sound recording and archiving.

In March 1913, he brought a wax cylinder recording device, which he had borrowed from his friend Charles Edison, to the home of former President Teddy Roosevelt, and convinced Roosevelt to speak into it. Thus began Vincent's private collection of voice recordings of notable individuals and witnesses to history.

In 1922, after graduating from Yale, he joined Edison Laboratories and worked in the restoration and preservation of antique recordings.

During the Second World War, Vincent helped establish the Armed Forces Radio Service. In 1943, his intervention in the musicians' strike led to the creation of the V-Disc, and he was subsequently awarded the Legion of Merit for his contributions to troop morale. After the war, he served as sound recording officer at the Nuremberg Trials.

In 1962, he donated his collection of over 8,000 voice recordings to the Libraries of Michigan State University. It became the basis of the G. Robert Vincent Voice Library, which as of 2015 has over 100,000 hours of recordings from over 500,000 people. Vincent was named assistant to the Director of the Libraries of MSU and curator of the Voice Library, a position he retained until retiring in 1973.
