= Alexander MacKerell =

American biochemist and biophysicist

- Title: Grollman-Glick Professor of Pharmaceutical Sciences

Academic background
- Education: Rowan College of South Jersey; University of Hawaiʻi at Mānoa; Rutgers University
- Doctoral advisor: Regina Pietruszko
- Other advisors: Rudolph Rigler; Martin Karplus

Academic work
- Discipline: Biochemistry; Biophysics
- Institutions: University of Maryland, Baltimore
- Website: mackerell.umaryland.edu

Alexander D. MacKerell, Jr. is an American biophysicist who is the Grollman-Glick Professor of Pharmaceutical Sciences at the University of Maryland, Baltimore (UMB) and the Director of the Computer-Aided Drug Design (CADD) Center at UMB. He is also the Co-Founder and Chief Scientific Officer of the drug design tech company SilcsBio. In 2022, MacKerell was awarded the prestigious American Chemical Society Award for Computers in Chemical and Pharmaceutical Research.

== Education and early career ==
Alexander D. MacKerell, Jr. began his post-secondary education at Rowan College of South Jersey, then Gloucester County College. He obtained an associate degree in biology in 1979, then a bachelor's degree in chemistry from the University of Hawaiʻi at Mānoa in 1981. MacKerell returned to New Jersey and enrolled at Rutgers University to work on a PhD under biochemist Regina Pietruszko, which he completed in 1985. MacKerell held a postdoctoral fellowship at the Karolinska Institute under Rudolf Rigler for two years before moving back to the US where he worked on the development of the CHARMM protein force field under Martin Karplus at Harvard University. MacKerell is currently a professor at University of Maryland, Baltimore in the Department of Pharmaceutical Sciences.

== Research ==
MacKerell's research contributions have been primarily in the field of computational biophysics, using modeling and simulation techniques such as Molecular dynamics or Monte Carlo to study the structure, function, and dynamics of biological macromolecules, including drug design. MacKerell has been a leading developer of the widely-used CHARMM all-atom additive force field, particularly on parameterization of lipids, nucleic acids, carbohydrates and organic small molecules. Alongside the lab of Benoit Roux, the MacKerell lab has led the development of the CHARMM-based Drude polarizable force field, which aims to address a key limitation of additive force fields, namely that each atom gets a single, fixed partial charge regardless of local environment. The group has developed or contributed to the development of online tools to make academic research more straightforward and accessible. In 2008, he was named the inaugural Grollman-Glick Professor of Pharmaceutical Science at UMB. In 2022, the American Chemical Society awarded MacKerell the Award for Computers in Chemical and Pharmaceutical Research.

MacKerell serves as an editor of the Journal of Computational Chemistry PLOS Computational Biology, and Proteins: Structure, Function, & Bioinformatics.

== Awards and honors ==
- Maryland Chemist of the Year 2006: Maryland Chapter of the American Chemical Society
- Researcher of the Year, University of Maryland, Baltimore, 2012
- The 16th Annual Goodman Lecture, Oregon Health & Science University, 2013
- International Society of Quantum Biology and Pharmacology (ISQBP) Computational Biology Award, 2020
- American Chemical Society Award for Computers in Chemical and Pharmaceutical Research, 2022
- Biophysical Society Fellow, 2026
