= Anna Krylov =

Theoretical chemist

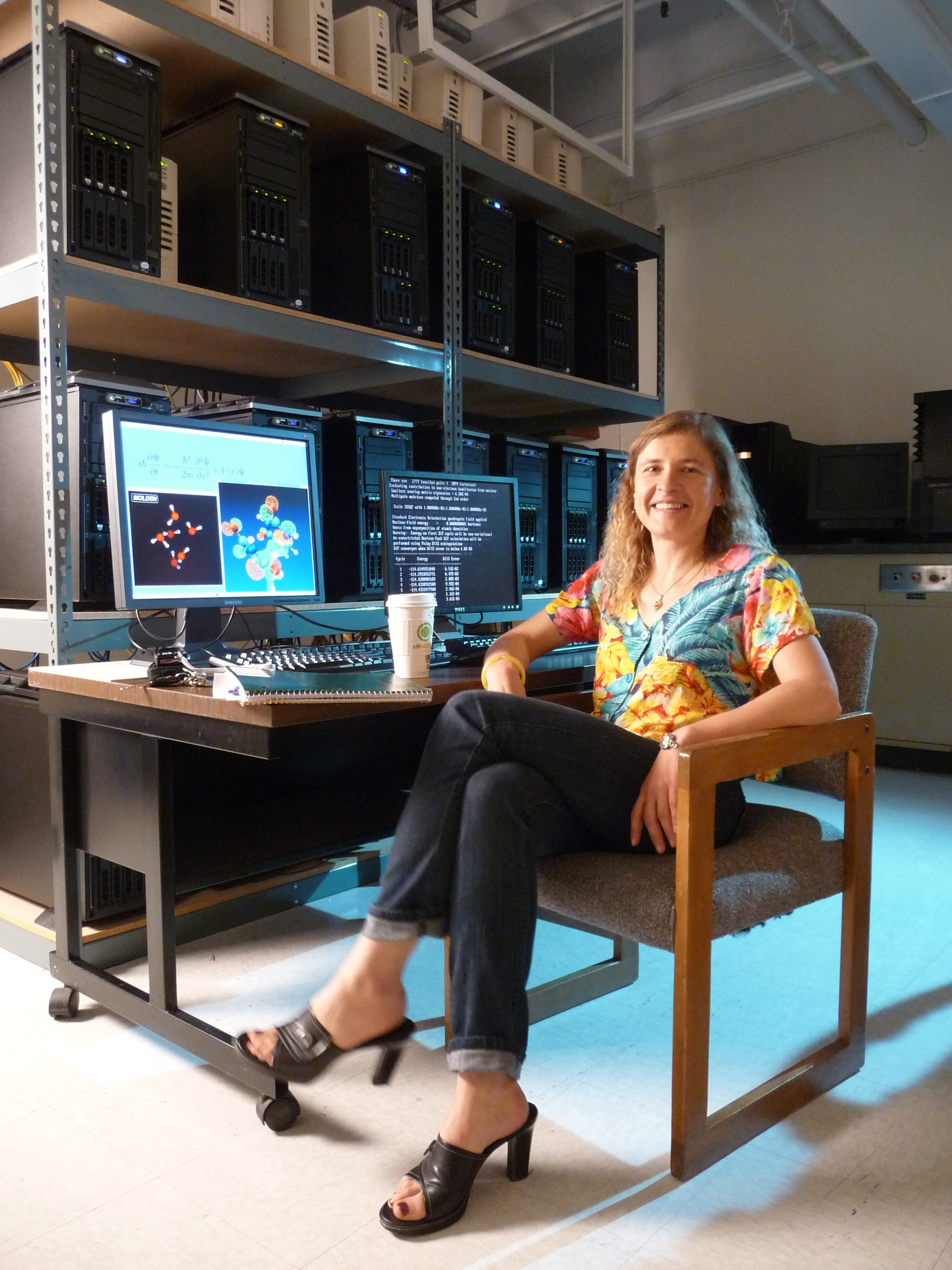
- Born: Anna Igorevna Krylov; May 6, 1967 (age 59); Donetsk, Ukraine
- Citizenship: United States, Israel, Russia
- Education: Moscow State University (MSc); Hebrew University of Jerusalem (PhD)
- Scientific career
- Fields: Theoretical chemistry; Computational quantum chemistry
- Workplaces: University of California, Berkeley; University of Southern California
- Website: iOpenShell Lab

Anna Igorevna Krylov (Russian: Анна Игоревна Крылова) is the USC Associates Chair in Natural Sciences and Professor of Chemistry at the University of Southern California (USC). Working in the field of theoretical and computational quantum chemistry, she is the inventor of the spin-flip method. Krylov has received worldwide recognition, in particular for her invention of the spin-flip method, has served on the editorial boards of numerous peer-review journals, and is a fellow of the American Physical Society, the American Chemical Society, the Royal Society of Chemistry, and the American Association for the Advancement of Science. She is the president of Q-Chem, Inc. and an elected member of the International Academy of Quantum Molecular Science, the Academia Europaea, the American Academy of Sciences and Letters, and the American Academy of Arts and Sciences.

== Life and education ==
Born in Donetsk, Ukraine, Krylov received her M.Sc. (with honors) in Chemistry from Moscow State University in 1990 and her Ph.D. (summa cum laude) from The Hebrew University of Jerusalem working under the supervision of Professor Robert Benny Gerber. Her Ph.D. research at the Fritz Haber Center for Molecular Dynamics focused on molecular dynamics in rare gas clusters and matrices.

== Career ==
Upon completing her Ph.D. in 1996, Krylov joined the group of Prof. Martin Head-Gordon at the University of California, Berkeley, as a postdoctoral research associate, where she became involved with electronic structure method development. In 1998, she joined the Department of Chemistry at USC.

=== Research ===
Professor Krylov leads the iOpenShell lab, a research group focused on theoretical modeling of open-shell and electronically excited species. She develops robust black-box methods to describe complicated multi-configurational wave functions in single-reference formalisms, such as coupled-cluster and equation-of-motion (or linear response) approaches. She developed the spin-flip approach, which extends coupled-cluster and density functional methods to biradicals, triradicals, and bond-breaking. Krylov has also contributed to the development of molecular orbital concepts in the framework of many-body wave functions and to the extension of molecular orbital theory to the domain of non-linear optical properties and meta-stable electronic states. In addition, Krylov develops many-body theories for describing metastable electronic states (resonances) and tools for spectroscopy modeling, including non-linear optical properties and core-level transitions. Krylov is also known for her development of efficient algorithms and software for quantum chemistry computations. She is one of the developers of the open-source libtensor library for many-body calculations and the Q-Chem electronic structure package.

Using the tools of computational chemistry, and in collaboration with numerous experimental laboratories, Krylov also investigates the role that radicals and electronically excited species play in such diverse areas as combustion, gas- and condensed-phase chemistry, astrochemistry, solar energy, quantum information storage, bioimaging, and light-induced biological processes. She has authored over 300 publications and has delivered more than 300 invited lectures, including the 2012 Löwdin Lecture at Uppsala University in Sweden, the 2013 Coulson Lecture at the University of Georgia, the 2018 Davison Lecture at the University of North Texas, and the 2023 Hans Hellmann Lecture at the Philipps-Universität Marburg in Germany.

=== Science education and outreach ===
Krylov has developed educational materials (computational labs and tutorials) aiming to increase quantum chemistry literacy among chemists. She has also developed films to help popularize science. The two iOpenShell films, Shine a Light and Laser, have been viewed more than 66,000 times on YouTube since September 2009. In 2015, Krylov delivered a public lecture in the Telluride Science and Innovation Center Town Talks series entitled “Molecules and Light: The Story of Life, Death, and our Quest for Knowledge”.

=== Awards ===
Krylov has received worldwide recognition, in particular for her invention of the spin-flip method. She received the 2007 WATOC (World Association of Theoretical and Computational Chemists) Dirac Medal for her "outstanding research on new methods in electronic structure theory for the description of bond-breaking, in particular the spin-flip method", and the Agnes Fay Morgan Research Award, given by Iota Sigma Pi National Honor Society for outstanding research achievements to a woman chemist or biochemist under 40 years of age. She is the recipient of a Friedrich Wilhelm Bessel Research Award from the Alexander von Humboldt Foundation for developing robust electronic structure methods for open-shell and electronically excited species and creative use of ab initio theory to understand the chemistry of biomolecules, reaction intermediates, and photoinduced processes; and the recipient of the 2012 Theoretical Chemistry Award from the Physical Chemistry Division of the American Chemical Society. In addition, she has received the USC Melon Mentoring Award, the Hanna Reisler Mentoring Award from the WiSE program, the USC Phi Kappa Phi Faculty Recognition Award, and the INSIGHT Into Diversity Inspiring Women in STEM Award. In 2017, Krylov was recognized with the Mildred Dresselhaus Award from the Center for Ultrafast Imaging at DESY in Hamburg, Germany. In 2018, she was awarded a Simons Fellowship in Theoretical Physics from the Simons Foundation. In 2020 she received the American Physical Society's prestigious Earle K. Plyler Prize for Molecular Spectroscopy & Dynamics for her:

"innovative work developing high accuracy electronic structure theory to inspire interpretation of spectroscopy of radicals, excited states, and ionization resonances in small molecules, biomolecules, and condensed phase solutes."

In 2022, she received the USC Associates Award for Creativity in Research and Scholarship, the highest scholarly award granted by the University. That same year, she received the inaugural Communicator of the Year Award, Science and Mathematics, from the USC Dornsife College of Letters, Arts, and Sciences. The award recognized her efforts to inform the scientific community and the general public through writings and speaking engagements of "the growing influence of politics and moral trends within STEM fields." In 2023, Krylov was inducted into the American Academy of Sciences & Letters and awarded the Academy's inaugural Barry Prize for Distinguished Intellectual Achievement.

Krylov is a fellow of the American Physical Society, the American Chemical Society, the Royal Society of Chemistry, and the American Association for the Advancement of Science.

=== Professional merit ===
Krylov has served on the editorial boards of numerous peer-review journals, including Annual Review of Physical Chemistry, the Journal of Chemical Physics, the Journal of Physical Chemistry, Chemical Physics Letters, the International Journal of Quantum Chemistry, Physical Chemistry–Chemical Physics, Molecular Physics, and Wires Computational Molecular Science. She has served as a guest editor of special issues of J. Phys. Chem. A honoring Prof. Benny Gerber and Prof. Hanna Reisler, the special issue of Chemical Reviews on Theoretical Modeling of Excited-State Processes, and the special issue of Physical Chemistry–Chemical Physics on Quantum Information Science. Currently, she is an associate editor of the journals Physical Chemistry-Chemical Physics (Royal Society of Chemistry) and Wires Computational Molecular Science (Wiley).

Krylov has organized numerous symposia and is a board member of WATOC and the International Society for Theoretical Chemical Physics. She is the president of Q-Chem Inc. and a developer of Q-Chem, one of the world's leading ab initio quantum chemistry programs. In addition, she is an elected member of the International Academy of Quantum Molecular Science, the Academia Europaea, and the American Academy of Arts and Sciences.

In addition to her permanent appointment at USC, Krylov is a Senior Professor by Special Appointment at Tel Aviv University. She has served as a visiting professor at Caltech, University of Minnesota (Minneapolis), University of Colorado (JILA), Heidelberg University, University of Mainz, University of Groningen, the Donostia International Physics Center in Spain, and the Center of Ultrafast Imaging at DESY in Hamburg.

== Activism ==
Krylov is active in the promotion of gender equality in STEM fields, especially in theoretical chemistry. She created and maintains the web directory Women in Theoretical and Computational Chemistry, Material Science, and Biochemistry that currently lists more than 400 scientists holding tenure and tenure track academic positions, or equivalent positions in industry, national laboratories, and other leading research establishments. She has delivered several talks on gender equality in STEM including a lecture at the international symposium in Uppsala, Sweden.

Krylov is a founding member of the Academic Freedom Alliance and a member of its academic leadership committee. Her paper, "The Peril of Politicizing Science," which "launched a national conversation among scientists and the general public" on the growing influence of political ideology over STEM, has received over 100,000 views and, according to Altmetric, was the all-time highest-ranked article in the Journal of Physical Chemistry Letters. Her works have been translated into Polish, Estonian, French, and Russian.

In October 2025, Krylov declined to peer review a manuscript for Nature Communications, cut ties with Nature Portfolio, and published an open letter, and in November 2025, wrote an article, calling for a boycott of Nature journals, accusing the publisher of abandoning its scientific mission in favor of a "social justice agenda". Among other criticisms, Krylov challenged Nature Reviews Psychology for encouraging "citation justice" practices aimed at "social-engineering their manuscript's bibliography to promote members of favoured identity groups", and Nature Human Behaviour for publishing what she termed a "censorship manifesto" declaring intent to censor research findings deemed potentially "harmful". The letter was endorsed by evolutionary biologist Richard Dawkins. Springer Nature representatives responded that citation diversity statements are optional for authors.
