= Charles L. Brooks III =

American biophysicist

- Born: Detroit
- Education: Alma College (BS); Purdue University (PhD)
- Scientific career
- Fields: Biophysics; Computational chemistry Theoretical chemistry
- Workplaces: University of Michigan
- Doctoral students: Teresa Head-Gordon
- Website: brooks.chem.lsa.umich.edu

Charles L. Brooks III is an American theoretical and computational biophysicist. He is the Cyrus Levinthal Distinguished University Professor of Chemistry and Biophysics, the Warner-Lambert/Park-Davis Professor of Chemistry, Professor of Biophysics and Chair of Biophysics at the University of Michigan.

== Career and research ==
Born in Detroit, Michigan, Brooks co-authored Proteins: A Theoretical Perspective of Dynamics, Structure, and Thermodynamics with 2013 Nobel Laureate in Chemistry, Martin Karplus, and B. Montgomery Pettitt. He has authored over 250 peer-reviewed journal articles and is also an editorial board member for the journals Molecular Simulation and Proteins. Since 2004, he has been the North American editor for the Journal of Computational Chemistry.

== Awards and honors ==
- Fellow of the Biophysical Society, 2016
- Gilda Loew Memorial Award of the International Society of Quantum Biology and Pharmacology (ISQBP), 2014
- Hans Neurath Award - The Protein Society, 2012
- Top 100 Chemists of 2000-2010 as identified by Thomson Reuters, 2011
- Purdue University Chemistry Alumni of the Year, 2010
- North American Editor of the Journal of Computational Chemistry, 2004
- Fellow of the American Association for the Advancement of Science, 2002
- Computerworld Smithsonian Award in Computational Science, 1997
- Alfred P. Sloan Foundation Fellow, 1992
