= Jayaraman Chandrasekhar =

Indian computational chemist and former professor

- Born: 23 October 1952 (age 73); Karnataka, India
- Education: Bangalore University IIT Madras; University of Erlangen-Nuremberg; Yale University
- Known for: Studies on the structure and bonding of organic molecules
- Awards: Dr. Hussain Zaheer Young Scientist Award; 1995 Shanti Swarup Bhatnagar Prize; 2004 Citation Laureate Award
- Scientific career
- Fields: Computational chemistry; Theoretical chemistry
- Workplaces: Indian Institute of Science; Neurogen Corporation
- Doctoral advisor: S. Subramanian; Paul von Ragué Schleyer; William L. Jorgensen

Jayaraman Chandrasekhar (born 1952) is an Indian computational chemist and a former professor at the department of organic chemistry of the Indian Institute of Science. He is known for his studies on the structure and bonding of organic molecules and is an elected fellow of Indian National Science Academy, and the Indian Academy of Sciences The Council of Scientific and Industrial Research, the apex agency of the Government of India for scientific research, awarded him the Shanti Swarup Bhatnagar Prize for Science and Technology, one of the highest Indian science awards, in 1995, for his contributions to chemical sciences.

== Biography ==
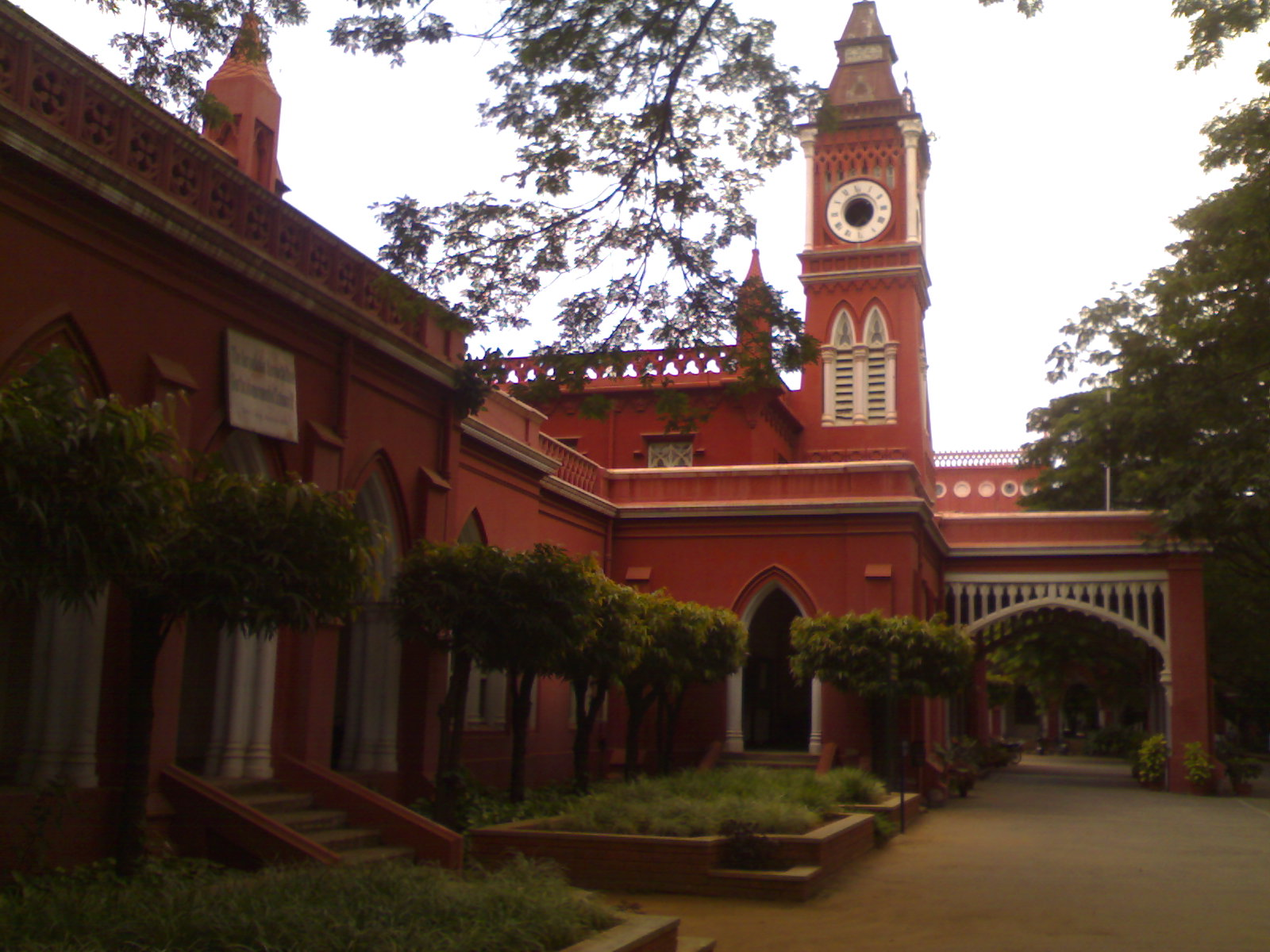
Bangalore University

J. Chandrasekhar, born on 23 October 1952 in the south Indian state of Karnataka, graduated in chemistry from Bangalore University in 1970 and joined the Indian Institute of Technology, Madras for his master's degree which he completed in 1972. He continued at IIT Madras for his doctoral studies on computational chemistry and theoretical organic chemistry under the guidance of S. Subramanian and secured a PhD in 1977. His post-doctoral studies were at University of Erlangen-Nuremberg at the laboratory of Paul von Ragué Schleyer, a fellow of the Royal Society of Chemistry and later at with William L. Jorgensen of Yale University as a research associate. In his return to India, he joined Indian Institute of Science as a member of the faculty of organic chemistry and while serving as a professor there, he moved to Neurogen Corporation, Branford where he pursues his researches.

== Legacy ==
Chandrasekhar is known to have worked extensively on the structure and bonding of organic molecules and their implications on chemical reactivity. His later researches were on the quantification of electronic effects, prediction of structures and energies and the computation of their molecular properties and his studies have reportedly widened the understanding of negative hyperconjugation in organic, organometallic and inorganic systems and captodative stabilization and distonic effect in radical ions. He has published his researches by way of chapters contributed to three books and several peer-reviewed articles; the online repository of Indian Academy of Sciences has listed 151 of them. He served as an elected member of the World Association of Theoretical and Computational Chemists from 1996 to 2005 and has been associated with Resonance and Journal of Science Education as an associate editor and with Current Science and Proceedings of Chemical Sciences as a member of their editorial boards.

== Awards and honors ==
Chandrasekhar has received the Dr. Hussain Zaheer Young Scientist Award and the Council of Scientific and Industrial Research awarded him the Shanti Swarup Bhatnagar Prize, one of the highest Indian science awards, in 1995. The Indian Academy of Sciences elected him as a fellow in 1992 and he became an elected fellow of and the Indian National Science Academy in 2000. He received the Citation Laureate Award of Thomson Scientific in 2004. He is also a senior fellow of the Jawaharlal Nehru Centre for Advanced Scientific Research and has held the National Lectureship of Science and Engineering Research Board.

== See also ==
- Paul von Ragué Schleyer
- William L. Jorgensen
