= Christian Cambillau =

French scientist (born 1951)

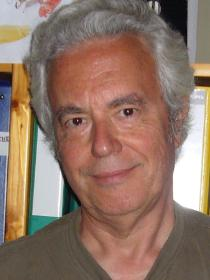
- Christian Cambillau
- Born: February 22, 1951 (age 75); Perpignan

Christian Cambillau (born February 22, 1951) is a French scientist for the CNRS (French National Scientific Research Centre) in Structural Biology. He received the CNRS Silver Medal for his work on structural biology, especially the structures of human lipase/colipase, lectins and the development of moleculargraphics software.

== Early life ==
Christian Cambillau was born in Perpignan to Madeleine Cambillau, a social worker, and August Cambillau a star officer in the French airforce. He studied in Perpignan and later on in Paris after moving there with his family. He obtained his Master in biology and chemistry at the University of Orsay, then a Ph.D. in bio-mimetic chemistry (crown-ether and cryptates).

== Career ==
After his Ph.D. (1978) he spent one year at ONERA for his military service. He was then hired by CNRS in the chemistry department (January 1, 1980). In 1982 he moved to Sweden to begin a two-year post-doc in the lab of Prof. Carl-Ivar Bränden, a pioneer of protein crystallography. Whilst there he worked to develop the TOM option in FRODO software, producing an automatic flexible protein-ligand docking software. He also participated to different works on protein crystallography and modelling. After Sweden he returned to France to work in the relatively new field of structural biology, joining a group in the CRMC2 laboratory located in Marseille on the Luminy Campus (Marseille University of science). He worked there for four years and developed a new molecular graphics program TURBO-FRODO. He then moved with the protein crystallography group when it was relocated to the Marseille North University Department. It's at the North University Department that he led his first team at the LCCMB lab (Laboratory of Crystallography and Crystallization of Biological Macromolecules) with this becoming one of the key points of his career. Whilst director he moved in 1995 to the Campus of Joseph Aiguier, where LCCMB became AFMB (Architecture et Fonction de Macromolecule Biologiques). He resigned the direction of the AFMB in 2004, with AFMB moving to the Luminy Campus in 2005. Since 2008 he is Head of Marseille-Nice Génopole.

• Direction:

- Director of the Laboratory of Crystallography and Crystallization of Biological Macromolecules, URA 1296: 07/01/1990 to 12/31/1995

- Laboratory Director "Architecture and Function of Biological Macromolecules" (UPR9039 and UMR6098): 1996-2004.

• Research management

- Member of the Section 21 of the National Committee (1995–2000)

- Member of the Jury of Admission Department Sciences de la Vie (2000–2002)

- Member of the Scientific Department Sciences de la Vie (2003–2004)

• Expertise national or international

- Expert at the Directorate of International Research at CNRS (1998–2000).

- Expert for orders from the research councils in various countries.

- Expert for the Program files HSFP.

- Expert for the records of the EU Marie Curie Research Training Grants.

- Member of program committee of the international lines of the ESRF and D2AM.

- Expert of the European Union (Panel of EOI for the 6th FP).

• Consultant

- SANOFI, 1990-1993.

- Company UNILEVER Netherlands, 1994-2000.

- Company UNILEVER United Kingdom, 1994-2000.

Christian Cambillau has also been the director and co-director of many Ph.D.'s

== Fields of action ==
•Chemistry:

Biomimetic chemistry, crown ethers and cryptates

Functional activation of fluorinated compounds

•Graphic Software (1982–2005):

TOM/FRODO + "FIT" Option

Turbo-Frodo (Developed by Alain Roussel under Christian Cambillau's direction):

Turbo-Frodo has been distributed to more than 1,000 sites, including 17 manufacturers.

•Biology:

Glycobiology (1985–2000)

Redox enzymes (since 1986)

Lipolytic enzymes (1984–2000)

Proteins of Olfaction (since 1994)

-Mammals

-Insects

Fragments of Antibody Classics and Camelids (1995–2000)

-Antibodies from Camelids

-Antibody Classics

The Structural Genomics (2001–2005)

-Genome Sequencing Project after (ASG)

-X-TB project

-SPINE and VIZIER

Membrane proteins (2002–2006)

-The GPCRs

Virus and Phages (since 2002)

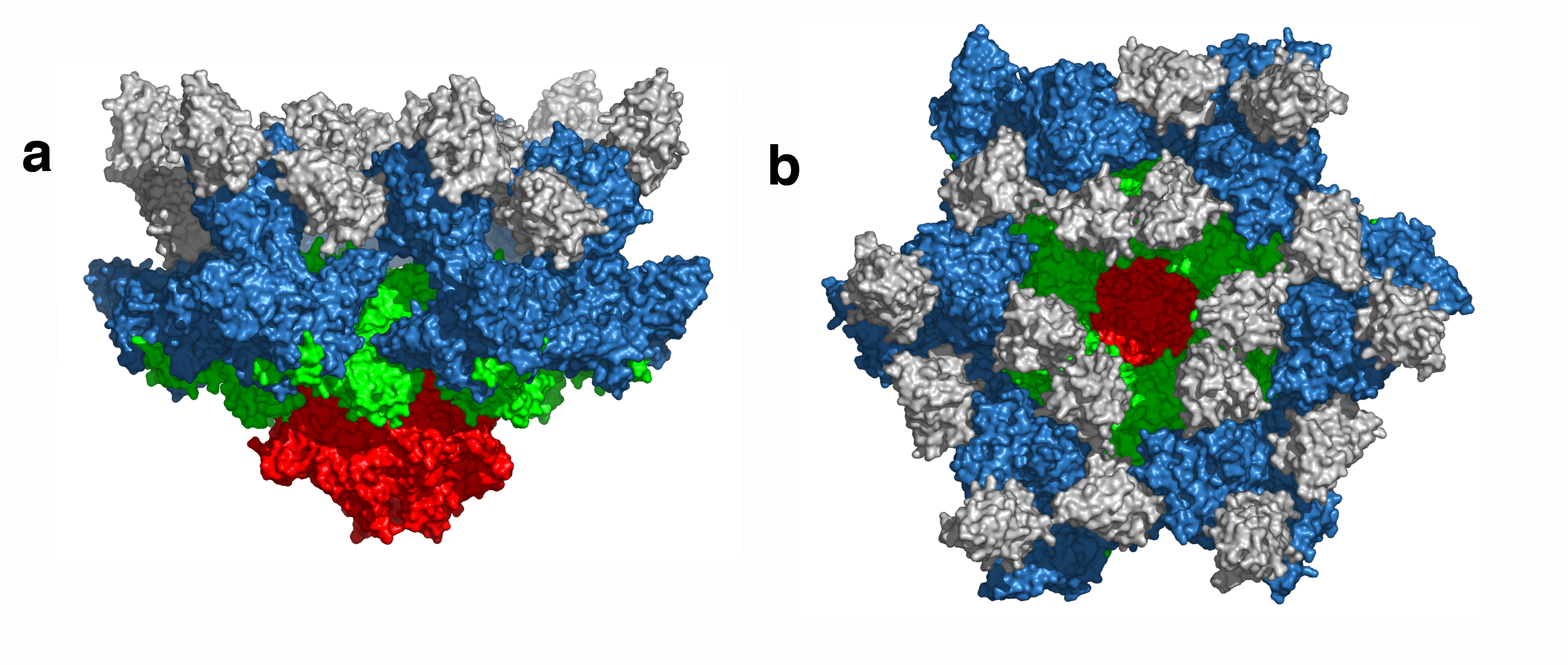
Xray structure of Lactococcal phage p2 baseplate

Secretion Systems (since 2009)

== Award ==
- CNRS Silver Medal:

“Christian CAMBILLAU, 44, CNRS research director, supervises the Laboratory of crystallography and crystallization of biological macromolecules, an associated CNRS-University of Aix-Marseille 2 research unit. He is an international specialist in the field of structural biology (crystallography) and has developed a software for modeling molecules using data from X rays or NMR, making France one of the very few countries to have developed software in the field of biological crystallography. His most innovative and spectacular work concerns the interactions between proteins and sugars (structural glycobiology) and the structural analysis of lipases (enzymes which hydrolyse fat). Thus, he was able to crystallize for the first time a lectin and glycoprotein complex, making it possible to carry out a precise three-dimensional analysis of interactions between proteins and complex sugars. He has also described the structural movements which can activate pancreatic lipase in the presence of its lipid substrate. This research is extremely important from both a medical and a biotechnological point of view.”

https://web.archive.org/web/20110720213240/http://www.cnrs.fr/cw/en/nomi/prix/Argent95/argent95.html

The press release associated with his silver medal award.

Other awards:

- Award "Pierre Desnuelle" From "l'Académie des Sciences" (Academy of Sciences) 1994.
- Award of the Society of Friends of Science (Academy of Sciences), 1994.
- Scientific award APDF “Celestino da Costa/Jean Perrin” (France-Portugal), 2000.

== Scientific contributions ==
-233 original articles in international journals with peer review (1976–2011, including Medline, Chemistry and Physics).

-Total number of citations: 8700 (1976–2011) "Web of Science" (http://apps.isiknowledge.com).

-Among the "Most Cited Scientists (All Fields) " by ISI (http://apps.isiknowledge.com)

-h-factor=52 (March 2011) by ISI "Web of Science" (http://apps.isiknowledge.com)

-more than 220 depositions with the Protein Data Bank (PDB ar rcsb, http://www.rcsb.org/pdb/results/results.do?outformat=&qrid=6CE10C70&tabtoshow=Current)

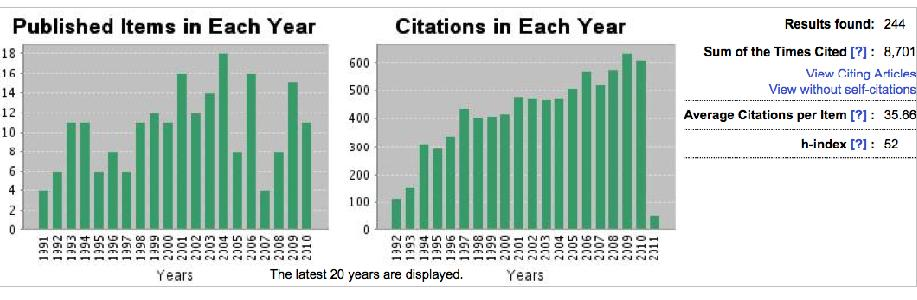
Articles statistics

Summary list of publications in major newspapers:

. Nature (34.480): 3 (1 article, 2 letters)

. Nature Methods (16.874): 2

. Nature Struct. Mol. Biol. (ex NSB) (12.273): 3

. Trends Biochem Sci (11.572): 2

. Proc. Natl Acad Sci USA (9.432): 8

. Curr. Opin. Struct. Biol. (9.344): 5

. EMBO Journal (8.993): 5

. Mol Microbiol (5.361): 2

. J Biol Chem (5.328): 29

. Biochem J (5.155): 5

. Journal of Virology (5.150): 3

. Structure (5.904): 4

. Mol Pharmacol (4.531): 2

. J Bacteriol (3.940): 4

. J Mol Biol (3.871): 29

. Appl Environ Microbiol (3.686): 2

. J. Struct. Biol. (3.673): 2

. FEBS Letters (3.541): 8

. Anal. Biochem. (3.287): 4

. Biochemistry (3.226): 15

. Proteins (3.085): 6

. Eur J Biochem (3.042; now FEBS Journal): 11

. Protein Science (2.937): 10

== Present life ==
Christian Cambillau is currently married to Mariella Tegoni and has two daughters. Christian Cambillau is still working for the CNRS.
