= Oxidation state localized orbitals =

Concept used to determine oxidation states

Oxidation state localized orbitals (OSLOs) is a new concept used to determine the oxidation states of each fragment for coordination complexes. Based on the result of density functional theory (DFT), all the occupied molecular orbitals are remixed to get the oxidation state localized orbitals. These orbitals are assigned to one of the fragments in this molecule based on the fragment orbital localization index (FOLI). After all the electrons are assigned, the oxidation states of each fragment could be obtained by calculating the difference between the number of electrons and protons in each fragment.

== History ==
Oxidation state is an important index to evaluate the charge distribution within molecules. The most common definition of oxidation state was established by IUPAC, which let the atom with higher electronegativity takes all the bonding electrons and calculated the difference between the number of electrons and protons around each atom to assign the oxidation states. However, the definition doesn't thoroughly consider the distribution of the bonding electrons and further restricts the applicability of oxidation states.

To precisely assign the oxidation state for each component in the molecule, especially for organometallic complexes, several different research groups, including Pedro Salvador and Martin Head-Gordon, have developed different methods to determine the oxidation states. In 2009, Martin Head-Gordon group established a new method called localized orbitals bonding analysis (LOBA) to assign the electrons associated with each localized orbitals. However, this method failed to provide reasonable oxidation states since the orbitals cannot be localized for some complicated systems.

To overcome this problem to get the correct assignment of oxidation states, in 2022, Martin Head-Gordon and Pedro Salvador decide to localize the electrons based on different fragments rather than atoms. Thus, they developed the method known as oxidation state localized orbitals (OSLOs), which can accurately assign electrons to different fragments to obtain the oxidation states of each fragment.

== General methods ==
=== Generation of full set of orbitals ===
Based on DFT, a full set of orbitals will compose the resulting OSLOs for each fragment. Then, these sets will be imported to the algorithm for further assignment of oxidation states and construction of OSLOs.

=== Localization measurement ===
The extent of delocalization could be quantified by using Pipek's delocalization measurement. For orbitals which are highly localized, the Pipek's indexes will be very close to 1. On the other hand, for highly delocalized orbitals, the Pipek's indexes become larger.

$$D_i= \frac{1}{\sum_(N_F^i)^2}$$

However, this method cannot evaluate the localization extent on each fragment. Thus, a new measurement is necessary. The fragment orbital localization index (FOLI) is defined as the square root of the fragment population over the delocalization index:

$$D_i^F=\sqrt{(\tfrac{D_i}{N_F^i})}$$

Based on this localization index, the localization extent on each fragment can be determined. with higher FOLI, it means the extent of localization on this fragment is relatively low, vice versa. Thus, after acquiring the FOLI, the electrons in each OSLO will be assigned to the fragment with the lowest FOLI.

=== Workflow ===
First, based on the results of density functional theory calculations. The set with the minimal FOLI is selected for further analysis. Then, after calculating the FOLI for each set, the set with the minimal FOLI is selected. For the selected set, the OSLOs are removed and the oxidation states are assigned based on these OSLOs.In this method, the fragment with the higher electron population gets all the electrons in this orbital. For all the other sets, they become the input for the next-round analysis, and the process repeats until all OSLOs are constructed and all electrons are assigned.

== Result ==
=== Significance ===
The valence OSLOs of the molecule can also be constructed using the method. The oxidation state of the ligand and metal are also determined and show consistency with the expected Lewis structure and can provide great insight for evaluating the redox reactivity.

Last FOLI and Δ-FOLI are two important values to evaluate the quality of the localization result. With the last FOLI closer to 1, it means that the OSLOs are highly localized on one fragment. On the other hand, Δ-FOLI is the difference between the last FOLI and the second-last FOLI. With a larger Δ-FOLI, it means the selected set of OSLOs is much better than other options, which indicates the unambiguity of this result.

=== Notable result ===
Oxidation state localized orbitals (OSLOs) of ferrocene with the isosurface value of 0.075 au.

For example, using the OSLOs for ferrocene shows great consistency with the prediction. The metal center was assigned the oxidation state of +2, and the Cp ligands were assigned the oxidation state of -1, which is quite consistent with the aromatic behavior of Cp. Furthermore, the last FOLI for ferrocene is 1.313 and the Δ-FOLI is 1.800, both indicating the unambiguity of the result.

However, for some complicated species possessing noninnocent ligands, the results become ambiguous. For example, several copper-trifluoromethyl complexes show small Δ-FOLI, which means the result is no longer unique. Moreover, whether the copper has the oxidation state of +3 or +1 remain controversial. Besides, for the Grubbs catalyst, the result is also inconsistent with conventional Fischer and Schrock classifications.

OSLO results for some representative complexes
Complex	M OS	L OS	Δ-FOLI	last FOLI
FeCp_{2}	+2	-1	1.800	1.313
[Cu(CF_{3})_{4}]^{1-}	+3	-1	0.373	1.516
[Cu(CF_{3})_{4}]^{2-} α	+2	-1	4.823	1.075
[Cu(CF_{3})_{4}]^{2-} β	+2	-1	2.528	1.267
PCy_{3}Cl_{2}Os=CH_{2}	+2	0	0.048	2.089
