= Paul von Ragué Schleyer =

American physical organic chemist

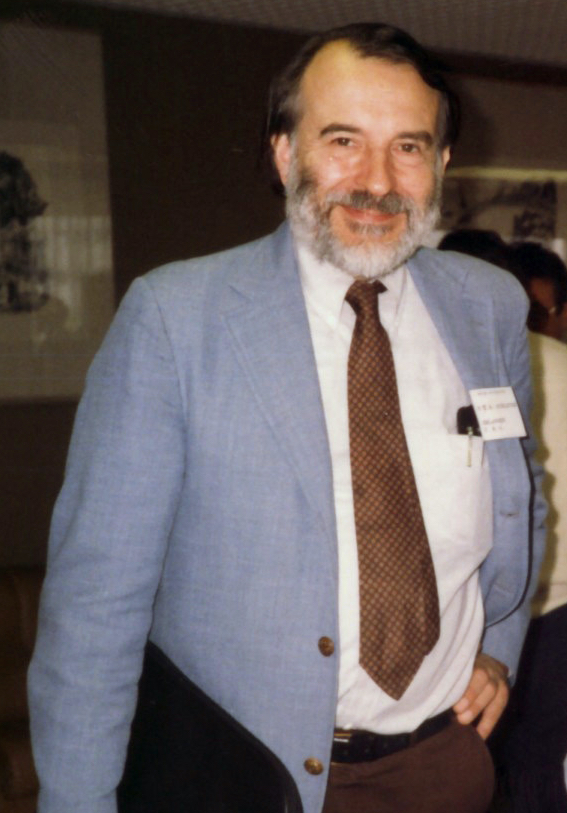
- 1987
- Born: February 27, 1930; Cleveland, Ohio
- Died: November 21, 2014 (aged 84); Ila, Georgia
- Education: Princeton University (A.B. 1951) Harvard University (Ph.D. 1957)
- Scientific career
- Workplaces: Princeton University University of Erlangen–Nuremberg University of Georgia
- Thesis: Bridged Ring Systems (1957)
- Doctoral advisor: Paul Doughty Bartlett
- Doctoral students: Jayaraman Chandrasekhar, Michael Bühl, Michelle Coote
- Other notable students: Debbie C. Crans, Peter Schreiner, Clémence Corminboeuf, Michelle Coote

Paul von Ragué Schleyer (February 27, 1930 – November 21, 2014) was an American physical organic chemist whose research is cited with great frequency. A 1997 survey indicated that Dr. Schleyer was, at the time, the world's third most cited chemist, with over 1100 technical papers produced. He was Eugene Higgins Professor of Chemistry at Princeton University, professor and co-director of the Institute for Organic Chemistry (Institut für organische Chemie) at the University of Erlangen–Nuremberg in Germany, and later Graham Perdue Professor of Chemistry at the University of Georgia in Athens, Georgia. He published twelve books in the fields of lithium chemistry, ab initio molecular orbital theory and carbonium ions. He was past president of the World Association of Theoretically Oriented Chemists, a fellow of the International Academy of Quantum Molecular Science and editor-in-chief of the Encyclopedia of Computational Chemistry.

== Early life ==
Born on February 27, 1930, in Cleveland, Ohio, Schleyer graduated as the valedictorian from his class at Cleveland West Technical High School in 1947. Schleyer received his A.B. degree from Princeton University in 1951 magna cum laude. He then earned his Ph.D. degree from Harvard University in 1957, where he worked under physical organic chemist Paul Doughty Bartlett.

== Princeton University years ==
Schleyer began teaching at Princeton in 1954 and became Eugene Higgins Professor of Chemistry there. Working within the Frick Laboratory on the Princeton campus, Schleyer was energetic both as a teacher and a researcher. While at Princeton, Schleyer married Inga Venema in 1969. During his Princeton years, Schleyer was awarded a Fulbright Fellowship, Alfred P. Sloan Fellowship, a J.J. Guggenheim Fellowship, and a Humboldt Special Fellowship. At Princeton he was always present in his combination laboratory/office until late in the evening.

== Synopsis of research and publications ==
Several of his twelve monographs are collaborations with Nobel Laureates J.A. Pople, H.C. Brown and G.A. Olah. In his research, Schleyer has made contributions in the area of synthesis of adamantane and other cage molecules by rearrangement mechanisms. He also discovered new types of hydrogen bonding. Schleyer also identified solvolysis mechanisms, including reactive intermediates.

As a pioneer in the field of computational chemistry, Schleyer identified a number of new molecular structures, especially related to lithium chemistry and electron deficient systems. He has further contributed to a gamut of topics in organometallic chemistry, physical organic chemistry, inorganic chemistry and other theoretical chemical fields. His research as of 2006 was rejuvenating interest in aromaticity and investigating planar hypercoordination of carbon.

== Honors ==
Beyond the fellowships noted above, Schleyer received numerous prestigious honors including:

- University of Lyon, France Dr. Honoris Causa, (1971)
- Bavarian Academy of Sciences, Fellow (1984)
- German Chemical Society Adolf-von-Baeyer-Prize (1986)
- American Chemical Society James Flack Norris Award in Physical Organic Chemistry (1987)
- Hungarian Chemical Society (1987)
- Heisenberg Medal (1987)
- World Association of Theoretically Oriented Chemists, President (1987)
- Royal Society of Chemistry, London, Christopher K. Ingold Medal (1988)
- American Chemical Society Cope Scholar Award (1971)
- Belgian Chemical Society Merck-Schuchardt Chair (1991)
- International Academy of Quantum Molecular Science, Fellow (1992)
- Bundesverdienstkreuz am Bande (1993)
- LMU Munich, Germany, Dr. Honoris Causa (1998)
- National Technical University of Ukraine "KPI", Kyiv, Honorary professor (1998)
- German Chemical Society Arfvedson Schlenk Prize (1999)
- Polish Chemical Society and the University of Warsaw, Kolos Medal (2002)
- University of Marburg, Germany, Dr. Honoris Causa (2011)
