= Csizmadia =

Csizmadia is a Hungarian surname. Notable people with the surname include:

- Csaba Csizmadia (born 1985), Romanian-born Hungarian footballer
- Eszter Csizmadia (born 1978), Hungarian judoka
- István Csizmadia (born 1944), Hungarian sprint canoeist
- Imre Gyula Csizmadia (1932–2022), Hungarian chemist
- Sándor Csizmadia (1871–1929), Hungarian politician and poet
- Zoltán Csizmadia (born 1977), Hungarian judoka
