= Ursula Röthlisberger =

Swiss computational chemist (born 1964)

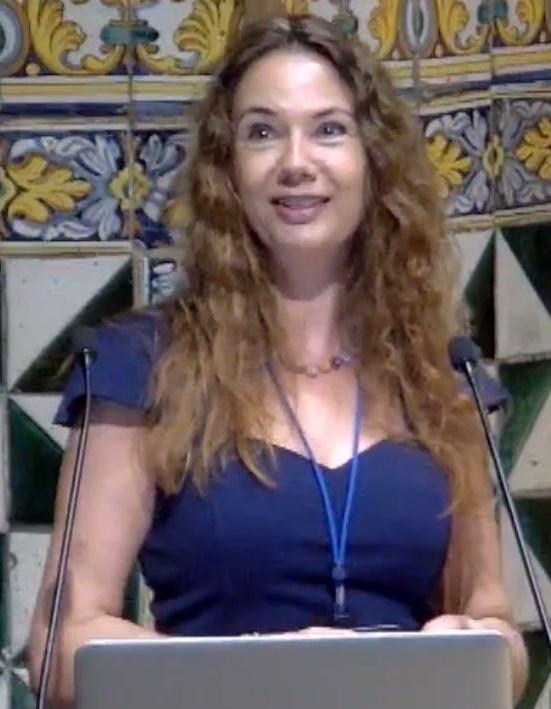
- Röthlisberger speaks at the 11th European Conference on Theoretical and Computational Chemistry in 2018
- Born: 1964 (age 61–62); Solothurn, Switzerland
- Education: University of Bern; IBM Zurich
- Scientific career
- Workplaces: ETH Zurich; EPFL
- Thesis: Strukturelle und elektronische Eigenschaften von Natriumcluster: Heterocluster aus den Gruppen 1 mit 14 (1991)
- Doctoral advisor: Wanda Andreoni
- Other academic advisors: Michael L. Klein; Michele Parrinello

Ursula Röthlisberger (born 1964) is a Swiss computational chemistry and professor at École Polytechnique Fédérale de Lausanne. She works on density functional theory using mixed quantum mechanical/molecular mechanical methods. She is an associate editor of the American Chemical Society Journal of Chemical Theory and Computation and a fellow of the American Association for the Advancement of Science.

== Early life and education ==
Röthlisberger was born in 1964 in Solothurn. She studied physical chemistry at the University of Bern. She earned her diploma under the supervision of Ernst Schumacher in 1988. She joined IBM Research – Zurich as a doctoral student with Wanda Andreoni. She worked in IBM Zurich as a postdoc until 1992. Röthlisberger moved to the University of Pennsylvania to work with Michael L. Klein. In 1995 she moved to Germany and joined the group of Michele Parrinello at the Max Planck Institute for Solid State Research. Together they used the Car-Parrinello method to study nanoscale clusters of silicon.

== Research and career ==
Röthlisberger was appointed assistant professor at ETH Zurich in 1996. She was the first woman to win the ETH Zurich Ruzicka Prize in 2001. She joined École Polytechnique Fédérale de Lausanne as an associate professor in 2002 and was made full professor in 2009. In 2005 she was the first woman to be awarded the World Association of Theoretical and Computational Chemists Dirac Medal.

Röthlisberger works on density functional theory, extending the Car-Parrinello method to include QM/MM simulations in a code called CPMD. QM/MM systems treat the electronically active part of a molecular structure as a quantum mechanical system, whereas the rest of the molecule is treated classically using molecular mechanics. She uses her hybrid Car–Parrinello systems to study enzymatic reactions to design biomimetic compounds. Röthlisberger has also expanded QM/MM to include ground to excited state transitions, making it possible to predict photoinduced charge separation and electron transfer. She also works on ab initio simulations of biological systems, and has added the Van der Waals interactions of macromolecules to density functional theory. She has used her simulations for several different applications, including the design of new materials for photovoltaics and exploring the operational mechanisms of chemotherapy. In 2017 she demonstrated that taking Auranofin whilst on RAPTA-T enhances the activity of the anti-cancer drug.

She teaches classes in Monte Carlo simulations and molecular dynamics.

=== Advocacy and engagement ===
Röthlisberger supports young women scientists and is involved with mentoring of early career researchers. She contributed to the book A Journey into Time in Powers of Ten. She is involved with scientific art, which is regularly used on the journals in which she publishes.

== Awards and honours ==
- 2001 Swiss Federal Institute of Technology at Zurich Ruzicka Prize
- 2004 World Association of Theoretical and Computational Chemists Dirac Medal
- 2015 European Chemical Society (EuChemS) Lecture Award
- 2015 International Academy of Quantum Molecular Science Member
- 2016 The Swiss Foundation for the Doron Prize
- 2018 American Association for the Advancement of Science Fellow
