= Clémence Corminboeuf =

Swiss chemist

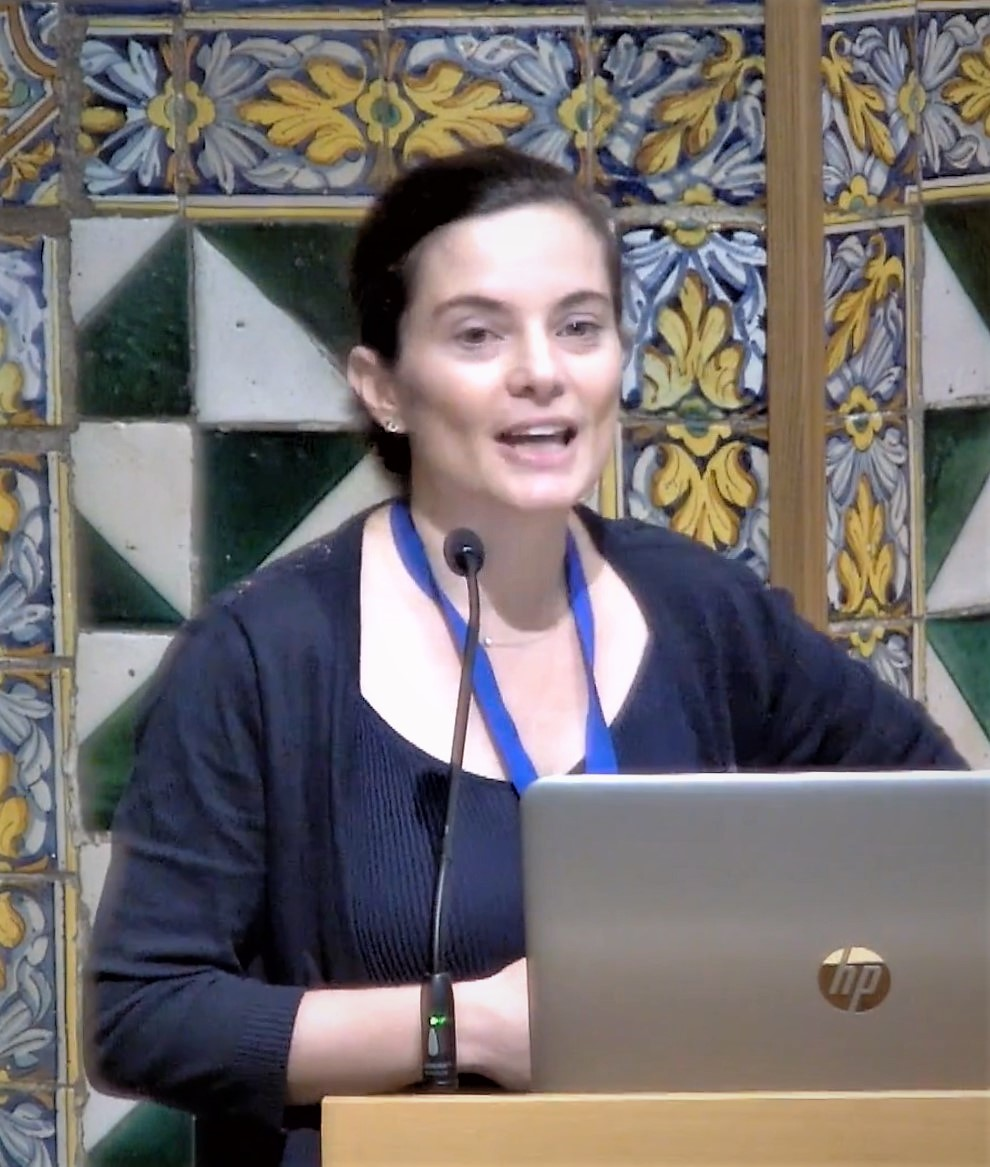
- Corminboeuf at the 11th European Conference on Theoretical and Computational Chemistry in 2018
- Born: 1977 (age 48–49)
- Education: University of Geneva; Dresden University of Technology; National Research Council Canada
- Scientific career
- Workplaces: École Polytechnique Fédérale de Lausanne
- Thesis: Quantum chemical calculations of NMR parameters and conformational study of organometallic compounds (2004)

Clémence Corminboeuf (born 1977) is a Swiss chemist who is Professor of Computational chemistry at the École Polytechnique Fédérale de Lausanne. She was awarded the Swiss Chemical Society 2021 Heilbronner-Hückel Award.

== Early life and education ==
Corminboeuf earned her bachelor's and master's degrees at the University of Geneva. She moved to Canada for her master's research, where she studied at the National Research Council Canada Steacie Institute for Molecular Sciences. She worked at both the Dresden University of Technology and the University of Geneva for her graduate studies, where she developed quantum chemical approaches to better calculate nuclear magnetic resonance of organometallic compounds. After completing her doctorate, Corminboeuf was awarded a Swiss National Science Foundation fellowship to move to New York University, where she investigated the catalytic mechanisms of zinc-dependent histone deacetylases using molecular models of how the deacetylation reaction is impacted by histone-deacetylase-like proteins. She moved to the University of Georgia to work in the laboratory of Paul von Ragué Schleyer.

== Research and career ==
In 2007, Corminboeuf was appointed tenure-track assistant professor at the École Polytechnique Fédérale de Lausanne (EPFL), and was promoted to full Professor in 2019. Corminboeuf works on theoretical predictions of electronic structure for catalytic and organic electronic materials. She was involved with the development of several quantum chemical approaches to predicting material properties. She serves on the executive committee of MARVEL, a Swiss National Science Foundation programme that looks to accelerate the computational design of new materials.

Corminboeuf developed the Density Overlap Regions Indicator (DORI), which allows the prediction of bonding and non-covalent interactions between molecular systems. She has made use of machine learning to understand the material properties of large systems that consist of non-covalent interactions, such as Van der Waals forces, halogen bonds and carbon-hydrogen-π interactions.

Corminboeuf is a member of the Young Academy of Europe. In 2021 Corminboeuf was awarded the Heilbronner-Hückel Lectureship Award.

== Awards and honours ==
- 2010 European Young Chemists' Network Silver Medal
- 2012 European Research Council Starting Grant
- 2014 Swiss Chemical Society Werner Prize
- 2018 American Chemical Society Early-Career Award in Theoretical Chemistry
- 2018 European Research Council Consolidator Grant
- 2020 University of Geneva Prix Jaubert
- 2021 Swiss Chemical Society Heilbronner-Hückel Lectureship Award

== Selected publications ==
- Alberto Fabrizio; Andrea Grisafi; Benjamin Meyer; Michele Ceriotti; Clémence Corminboeuf (9 September 2019). "Electron density learning of non-covalent systems". Chemical Science. 10 (41): 9424–9432. doi:10.1039/c9sc02696g. ISSN 2041-6520. PMC 6991182. PMID 32055318. Wikidata Q89703160.
- Michael Busch; Matthew D Wodrich; Clémence Corminboeuf (2 September 2015). "Linear scaling relationships and volcano plots in homogeneous catalysis - revisiting the Suzuki reaction". Chemical Science. 6 (12): 6754–6761. doi:10.1039/c5sc02910d. ISSN 2041-6520. PMC 5508671. PMID 28757966. Wikidata Q41003783.
- Michael Busch; Matthew D. Wodrich; Clémence Corminboeuf (17 July 2017). "A Generalized Picture of C–C Cross-Coupling". ACS Catalysis. 7 (9): 5643–5653. doi:10.1021/acscatal.7b01415. ISSN 2155-5435. Wikidata Q63973412.
- Alberto Fabrizio; Ksenia R Briling; David D Girardier; Clémence Corminboeuf (1 November 2020). "Learning on-top: Regressing the on-top pair density for real-space visualization of electron correlation". The Journal of Chemical Physics. 153 (20): 204111. arXiv:2010.07116. doi:10.1063/5.0033326. ISSN 0021-9606. PMID 33261488. Wikidata Q103824915.
- Piotr De Silva; Clémence Corminboeuf (30 June 2014). "Simultaneous Visualization of Covalent and Noncovalent Interactions Using Regions of Density Overlap". Journal of Chemical Theory and Computation. 10 (9): 3745–3756. doi:10.1021/ct500490b. ISSN 1549-9618. PMC 4158806. PMID 25221443. Wikidata Q41811223.
