= Alexandre Tkatchenko (physicist) =

Physicist and professor

- Born: 1980 (age 45–46)
- Education: Universidad Autónoma Metropolitana in Mexico City
- Awards: Fellow, American Physical Society; Watoc Dirac Medal from the World Association of Theoretical and Computational Chemists; Gerhard Ertl Young Investigator Award of the German Physical Society
- Scientific career
- Fields: Intermolecular interactions, chemical physics, materials physics
- Workplaces: University of Luxembourg, Alexander von Humboldt Fellow at the Fritz Haber Institute of the Max Planck Society in Berlin

Alexandre Tkatchenko (born 1980) is a professor of theoretical chemical physics at the University of Luxembourg who works in intermolecular interactions, chemical physics, and materials physics. He serves as Head of the Department of Physics and Materials Science. Tkatchenko is a 2019 recipient of an American Physical Society Fellowship, in the Division of Computational Physics, cited "For the development of a novel framework for modeling and understanding van der Waals interactions in molecules and materials".

== Education ==
Tkatchenko earned a bachelor's degree in computer science, and a Ph.D. in physical chemistry, with the thesis "Estudio del potential atomo-superficie y su influencia sobre la estructura de monocapas adsorbidas" ("Study of atom-surface potential and its influence on the structure of adsorbed monolayers") at the Universidad Autónoma Metropolitana in Mexico City. From 2008−2010, he was an Alexander von Humboldt Fellow at the Fritz Haber Institute of the Max Planck Society in Berlin, where he led an independent research group from 2011–2016.

Tkatchenko serves on the editorial boards of Physical Review Letters (APS) and Science Advances (AAAS). He was elected Fellow of the American Physical Society in 2019, and has earned the 2020 Watoc Dirac Medal from the World Association of Theoretical and Computational Chemists, the 2011 Gerhard Ertl Young Investigator Award of the German Physical Society, and grants from the European Research Council: a Starting Grant in 2011, a Consolidator Grant in 2017, a Proof of Concept Grant for his project MACHINE-DRUG, and an ERC Advanced Grant on Quantum Materials in 2022.

== Selected publications ==
- Tkatchenko, Alexandre; Scheffler, Matthias (2009-02-20). "Accurate Molecular Van Der Waals Interactions from Ground-State Electron Density and Free-Atom Reference Data". Physical Review Letters. 102 (7). doi:10.1103/PhysRevLett.102.073005. hdl:11858/00-001M-0000-0010-F9F2-D. ISSN 0031-9007. Archived from the original on 2025-12-30.
- Rupp, Matthias; Tkatchenko, Alexandre; Müller, Klaus-Robert; Von Lilienfeld, O. Anatole (2012-01-31). "Fast and Accurate Modeling of Molecular Atomization Energies with Machine Learning". Physical Review Letters. 108 (5) 058301. arXiv:1109.2618. doi:10.1103/PhysRevLett.108.058301. ISSN 0031-9007.
- Schütt, Kristof; Kindermans, Pieter-Jan; Sauceda Felix, Huziel Enoc; Chmiela, Stefan; Tkatchenko, Alexandre; Müller, Klaus-Robert (2017). "SchNet: A continuous-filter convolutional neural network for modeling quantum interactions". Advances in Neural Information Processing Systems. 30. Curran Associates, Inc.
- Schütt, K. T.; Sauceda, H. E.; Kindermans, P.-J.; Tkatchenko, A.; Müller, K.-R. (2018-03-29). "SchNet – A deep learning architecture for molecules and materials". The Journal of Chemical Physics. 148 (24). arXiv:1712.06113. doi:10.1063/1.5019779. ISSN 0021-9606. Archived from the original on 2025-11-22.
- Schütt, Kristof T.; Arbabzadah, Farhad; Chmiela, Stefan; Müller, Klaus R.; Tkatchenko, Alexandre (2017-01-09). "Quantum-chemical insights from deep tensor neural networks". Nature Communications. 8 (1) 13890. arXiv:1609.08259. doi:10.1038/ncomms13890. ISSN 2041-1723.
