= Peter Gill (chemist) =

New Zealand chemist (born 1962)

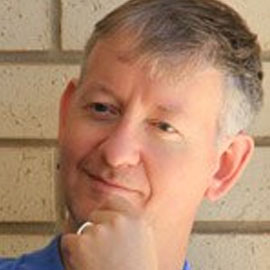
- Born: Peter Malcolm Wallace Gill; 9 November 1962 (age 63); Auckland, New Zealand
- Education: Australian National University
- Scientific career
- Fields: Chemistry
- Workplaces: Massey University; University of Cambridge; University of Nottingham; Australian National University; University of Sydney
- Thesis: A theoretical approach to hemi-bonded systems and their dicationic analogues (1988)
- Doctoral advisor: Leo Radom
- Other academic advisors: John Pople

Peter Malcolm Wallace Gill (born 9 November 1962) is a New Zealand theoretical and computational chemist known for his contribution to density functional theory (DFT). He is an early and main contributor to the computational chemistry software Q-Chem and was the president of the company during 1998–2013. He is especially known for developing the PRISM algorithm for evaluating two-electron integrals and linear-scaling DFT, as well as self-consistent field method for excited state electronic structure.

== Education and career ==
Gill was born in Auckland and received his BSc in 1983 and MSc in 1984 from the University of Auckland. He received a PhD in 1988 from the Australian National University under the supervision of Leo Radom. During this time, he investigated hemi-bonding and the convergence of perturbation theory in quantum chemistry. After graduation, he conducted postdoctoral work with John Pople at Carnegie Mellon University from 1988 to 1993. Following this stint, Gill accepted a lectureship at Massey University in 1993. He became a lecturer at the University of Cambridge in 1996. In 1999, Gill became the inaugural chair of theoretical chemistry at the University of Nottingham. He moved to Australia and became a professor at the Australian National University in 2004 and moved to the Schofield Chair in Theoretical Chemistry at the University of Sydney in 2019. He resigned from the University of Sydney at the end of 2025.

In 2001, Gill wrote an essay pronouncing the demise of density functional theory thanks to the rise of hybrid functionals for exchange interactions between electrons.

== Honors and awards ==
Gill received the Dirac Medal of the World Association of Theoretical and Computational Chemists (WATOC) in 1999 and its Schrödinger Medal in 2011. He was the president of WATOC during 2017 - 2025. He received the Pople Medal of the Asia-Pacific Association of Theoretical and Computational Chemists (APATCC) in 2005 and its Fukui Medal in 2013. He has been the president of APATCC since 2025. Gill was elected a Fellow of the Australian Academy of Science in 2014 and received its David Craig Medal in 2019. In 2015 Gill was inducted to the International Academy of Quantum Molecular Science and has been its president since 2026.
