= Teresa Head-Gordon =

American chemist

- Born: Teresa Lyn Gordon; Akron, Ohio, U.S.
- Education: Case Western Reserve University (BS); Carnegie Mellon University (PhD)
- Spouse: Martin Head-Gordon
- Awards: Fellow of the American Institute for Medical and Biological Engineering (2016); Fellow of the American Chemical Society (2018)
- Scientific career
- Fields: Computational chemistry
- Workplaces: Bell labs University of California, Berkeley; Lawrence Berkeley National Laboratory
- Thesis: Macroscopic and microscopic simulation methods as applied to biological macromolecules (1989)
- Doctoral advisor: Charles L. Brooks III
- Other academic advisors: Frank Stillinger
- Website: thglab.berkeley.edu

Teresa Lyn Head-Gordon (née Teresa Lyn Gordon) is an American chemist and the Chancellor's Professor of Chemistry, Bioengineering, and Chemical and Biomolecular Engineering at the University of California, Berkeley. She is also a faculty scientist in the Chemical Sciences Division at the Lawrence Berkeley National Laboratory and a fellow of both the American Institute for Medical and Biological Engineering (AIMBE ) and the American Chemical Society (ACS).

== Early life and education ==
Head-Gordon was born in Akron, Ohio. She completed her bachelor's degree in chemistry at Case Western Reserve University in 1983. She worked as a waitress for a year before starting a PhD in 1984, and in 1989 she earned her doctorate degree in Theoretical Chemistry from Carnegie Mellon University under the supervision of Charles L. Brooks III.

== Research and career ==
From 1990 to 1992 Head-Gordon worked as a postdoctoral member of technical staff at Bell Labs, studying protein folding and the perturbation theories of water with Frank Stillinger. She joined Lawrence Berkeley National Laboratory in 1992, where she worked as a staff scientist until 2001. In 2001 Head-Gordon was awarded the IBM-SUR Award. That year she became a faculty member of Bioengineering at University of California, Berkeley. She was the 2005 Schlumberger Fellow at the University of Cambridge. In 2011 she became a member of Chemical and Biomolecular Engineering department; in 2012 she joined the chemistry department at University of California, Berkeley., and joined the chemical sciences division as a faculty scientist at Lawrence Berkeley National Laboratory. In 2012 she was made the Chancellor's Professor at the University of California, Berkeley. She is a member of the Pitzer Center for Theoretical Chemistry.

Head-Gordon develops theoretical models that are used in chemical physics and biophysics. The Head-Gordon group studies condensed phase systems ranging from biomolecular systems, molecular liquids, and complex interfaces. Her group develops software packages for molecular simulations.

She is on the Board of Directors of the Molecular Sciences Software Institute. She became co-director of CalSov in 2016. In 2016 she was elected a fellow of the American Institute for Medical and Biological Engineering for her contributions to the computational methodologies for macromolecular assemblies. In 2018 she was elected a Fellow of the American Chemical Society.
