= Peter Schreiner (chemist) =

German chemist

Peter Richard Schreiner (born 17 November 1965 in Nuremberg, Germany) is a German chemist who is a professor at Justus Liebig University Giessen. As of 2022, his h-index is 73.

== Career ==
Schreiner studied at the University of Erlangen-Nuremberg, where he received his diploma in 1992 (with Paul von Ragué Schleyer). He obtained his doctorate in organic chemistry in 1995 from the University of Georgia. From 1996 to 1999 he was a Liebig Fellow at the University of Göttingen. While there he received the ADUC Prize for his work. From 1999 to 2002, he was associate professor of Organic Chemistry at the University of Georgia. Since 2002 he has been a professor of Organic Chemistry at the University of Giessen. From 2012 to 2015 he was vice president for Research and Promotion of Young Researchers at the University of Giessen. From 2006 to 2009 he was Dean of the Faculty of Biology and Chemistry. He has been a visiting professor at the Lorand Eötvös University in Budapest, at Technion in Haifa, at the University of Bordeaux, and at Stanford University. Schreiner was German Chemical Society (GDCh) President from 2020 to 2021.

== Work ==
His research interests include organocatalysis, nanodiamonds (diamondoids), green chemistry, organic electronics, matrix isolation of reactive intermediates such as carbenes, and computational chemistry. He discovered the mechanism of tunnel control of reactions and demonstrated their diffusion, thus establishing a third driver of chemical reactions besides thermodynamic (energetically most favorable) and kinetic control (least barrier) (published in Science, 2011). He is one of the pioneers of organocatalysis, in which metal-containing catalysts are replaced by more environmentally friendly customized organic catalysts.

Schreiner found a way to integrate nanodiamonds, which naturally occur in natural gas and petroleum but have nanoscale dimensions, into a coatings. In 1997 he helped develop the thiourea organocatalysis.

== Publications ==
- Schreiner, Peter R.; Reisenauer, Hans Peter; Ley, David; Gerbig, Dennis; Wu, Chia-Hua; Allen, Wesley D. (10 June 2011). "Methylhydroxycarbene: Tunneling Control of a Chemical Reaction". Science. 332 (6035). American Association for the Advancement of Science (AAAS): 1300–1303. Bibcode:2011Sci...332.1300S. doi:10.1126/science.1203761. ISSN 0036-8075. PMID 21659600. S2CID 5468625.
- Schreiner, Peter R. (2003). "Metal-free organocatalysis through explicit hydrogen bonding interactions". Chemical Society Reviews. 32 (5). Royal Society of Chemistry (RSC): 289–296. doi:10.1039/b107298f. ISSN 0306-0012. PMID 14518182.
- Zhang, Zhiguo; Schreiner, Peter R. (2009). "(Thio)urea organocatalysis—What can be learnt from anion recognition?". Chemical Society Reviews. 38 (4). Royal Society of Chemistry (RSC): 1187–1198. doi:10.1039/b801793j. ISSN 0306-0012. PMID 19421588.

== Honors ==
Schreiner has been a member of the Academy of Sciences Leopoldina since 2013. In 2015 he was elected to the North Rhine-Westphalian Academy of Sciences and Arts. He is an honorary member of the Polish and Israeli Chemical Societies. In 2003 he received the Dirac Medal of the World Association of Theoretical and Computational Chemists and the Science Prize of the German Technion Society. For 2017 he was awarded the Adolf von Baeyer Medal of the GDCh.

From 1995 to 1996 he was Project Coordinator of the Encyclopedia of Computational Chemistry. From 2011 he has been Associate Editor of the Beilstein Journal of Organic Chemistry, from 2000 he has been Editor of the Journal of Computational Chemistry and since 2008 he has been Principal Editor of review journal WIRES-Computational Molecular Sciences.
