= Martin Karplus =

Austrian-American chemist (1930–2024)

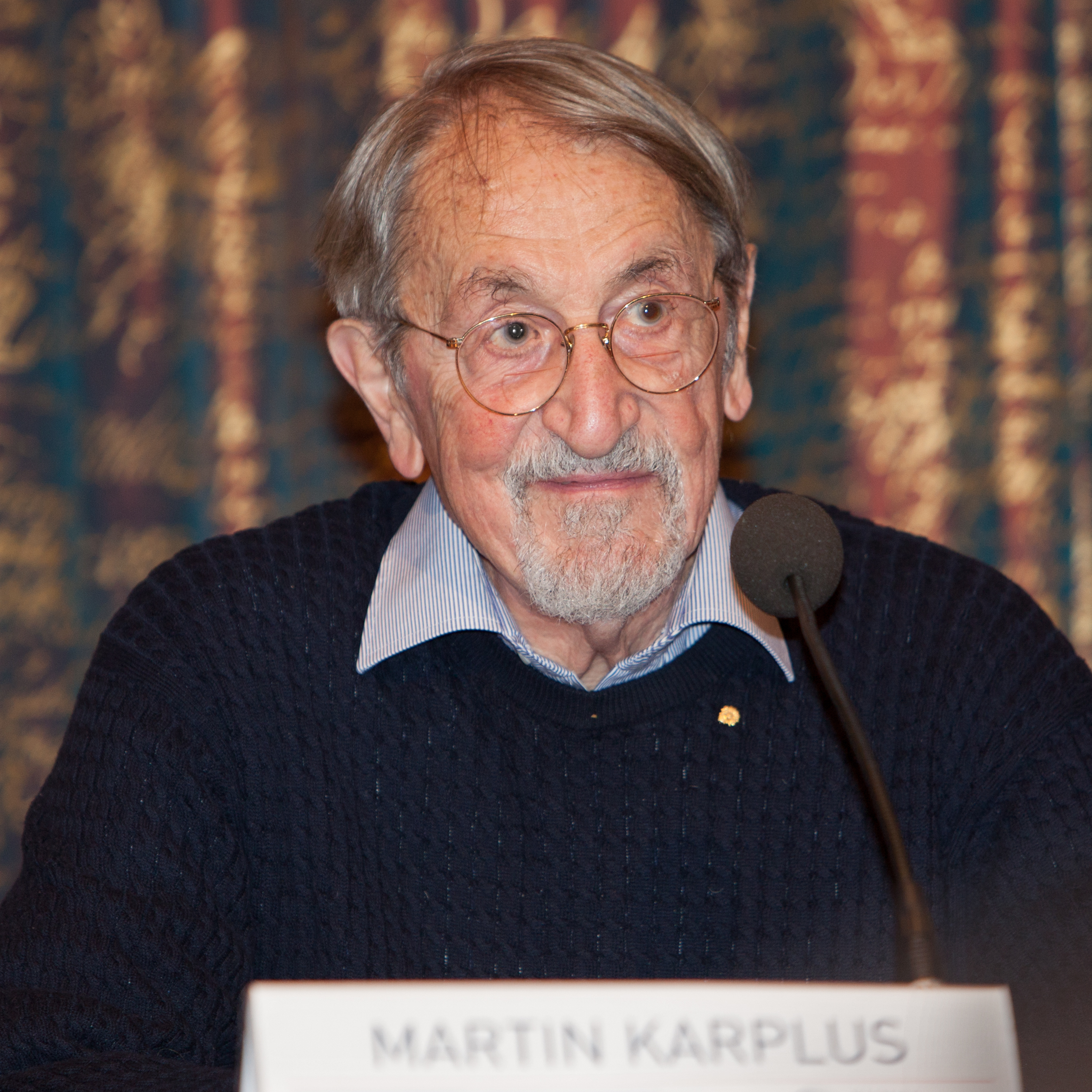
- Nobel Prize Laureate Martin Karplus during press conference in Stockholm, December 2013
- Born: March 15, 1930; Vienna, Austria
- Died: December 28, 2024 (aged 94); Cambridge, Massachusetts, U.S.
- Citizenship: American, Austrian
- Education: Harvard University (BA); California Institute of Technology (PhD)
- Awards: Irving Langmuir Award (1987); Award in Theoretical Chemistry (1993); ForMemRS (2000); Linus Pauling Award (2004); Nobel Prize in Chemistry (2013)
- Scientific career
- Fields: Theoretical chemistry
- Workplaces: Université de Strasbourg; Harvard University; Columbia University; University of Illinois Urbana-Champaign
- Thesis: A quantum-mechanical discussion of the bifluoride ion (1954)
- Doctoral advisor: Linus Pauling
- Website: martin-karplus.faculty.chemistry.harvard.edu

Martin Karplus (German: [ˈmaʁtiːn ˈkaʁplʊs]; March 15, 1930 – December 28, 2024) was an Austrian and American theoretical chemist. He was the Theodore William Richards Professor of Chemistry at Harvard University. He was also the director of the Biophysical Chemistry Laboratory, a joint laboratory between the French National Center for Scientific Research and the University of Strasbourg, France. Karplus received the 2013 Nobel Prize in Chemistry, together with Michael Levitt and Arieh Warshel, for "the development of multiscale models for complex chemical systems".

== Early life ==
Martin Karplus was born on March 15, 1930, in Vienna, Austria. He was a child when his family fled from the Nazi-occupation in Austria a few days after the Anschluss in March 1938, spending several months in Zürich, Switzerland and La Baule, France before immigrating to the United States. Prior to their immigration to the United States, the family was known for being "an intellectual and successful secular Jewish family" in Vienna. His grandfather, Johann Paul Karplus (1866–1936) was a highly acclaimed professor of psychiatry at the University of Vienna. His great-aunt, Eugenie Goldstern, was an ethnologist who was killed during the Holocaust. He was the nephew, by marriage, of the sociologist, philosopher and musicologist Theodor W. Adorno and grandnephew of the physicist Robert von Lieben. His brother, Robert Karplus, was an internationally recognized physicist and educator at University of California, Berkeley. Continuing with the academic family theme, his nephew, Andrew Karplus, is a biochemistry and biophysics professor at Oregon State University.

== Education ==
After earning a BA degree in Chemistry and Physics from Harvard College in 1951, Karplus pursued graduate studies at the California Institute of Technology. He completed his PhD in 1953 under Nobel laureate Linus Pauling. According to Pauling, Karplus "was [his] most brilliant student." He was an NSF Postdoctoral Fellow at the University of Oxford (1953–55) where he worked with Charles Coulson.

== Teaching career ==
Karplus taught at the University of Illinois at Urbana–Champaign (1955–60) and then Columbia University (1960–65) before moving to join the Chemistry Department faculty at Harvard in 1966.

He was a professor at the Louis Pasteur University in 1996 where he established a research group in Strasbourg, France, after two sabbatical visits between 1992 and 1995 in the NMR laboratory of Jean-François Lefèvre. He has supervised more than 200 graduate students and postdoctoral researchers over his career since 1955.

== Personal life and death ==
Karplus was married to Marci and had three children. He died at his home in Cambridge, Massachusetts, on December 28, 2024, at the age of 94.

== Research ==
Karplus published his first academic paper when he was 17 years old. Karplus contributed to many fields in physical chemistry, including chemical dynamics, quantum chemistry, and most notably, molecular dynamics simulations of biological macromolecules. He has also been influential in nuclear magnetic resonance spectroscopy, particularly to the understanding of nuclear spin-spin coupling and electron spin resonance spectroscopy. The Karplus equation describing the correlation between coupling constants and dihedral angles in proton nuclear magnetic resonance spectroscopy is named after him.

From 1969 to 1970, Karplus visited the Structural Studies Division at the MRC Laboratory of Molecular Biology.

In 1970 postdoctoral fellow Arieh Warshel joined Karplus at Harvard. Together they wrote a computer program that modeled the atomic nuclei and some electrons of a molecule using classical physics and modeling other electrons using quantum mechanics. In 1974 Karplus, Warshel and other collaborators published a paper based on this type of modeling, which successfully modeled the change in shape of retinal, a molecule important to vision.

His research was concerned primarily with the properties of molecules of biological interest. His group originated and coordinated the development of the CHARMM program for molecular dynamics simulations.

=== Books ===
- Karplus, Martin (2020). Spinach on the Ceiling: The Multifaceted Life of a Theoretical Chemist. WORLD SCIENTIFIC (EUROPE). doi:10.1142/q0238. ISBN 978-1-78634-802-9.
- Brooks, Charles L.; Karplus, Martin; Pettitt, B. Montgomery (November 16, 1988). Advances in Chemical Physics, Volume 71. New York: Wiley-Interscience. ISBN 978-0-471-62801-9.
- Karplus, Martin; Porter, Richard N. (1970). Atoms and Molecules: An Introduction for Students of Physical Chemistry. New York: W. A. Benjamin. ISBN 978-0-8053-5218-4.

=== Notable students and postdocs ===
- Bernard R. Brooks (National Institutes of Health)
- Charles L. Brooks III (University of Michigan, Ann Arbor)
- Axel T. Brunger (Stanford University)
- J. Andrew McCammon (UCSD) (w/ Karplus and Gelin) published the first MD simulation of BPTI
- P. T. Narasimhan (University of Illinois) Shanti Swarup Bhatnagar laureate
- B. Montgomery Pettitt (University of Texas Medical Branch, Baylor College of Medicine, The Gulf Coast Consortia (GCC))
- Benoît Roux (University of Chicago)
- Andrej Šali (University of California, San Francisco)
- Klaus Schulten (University of Illinois)
- Jeremy C. Smith (Oak Ridge National Laboratory)
- David J. States (The University of Texas Health Science Center at Houston)
- Arieh Warshel (University of Southern California) (co-recipient of the 2013 Nobel Prize in Chemistry, along with Karplus and Michael Levitt (Stanford))
- Eugene Shakhnovich, (Harvard University)
- Alexander D. MacKerell Jr. (University of Maryland, Baltimore)
- John Kuriyan (Vanderbilt University)

== Awards and honours ==
Karplus was elected a member of the National Academy of Sciences in 1967. He was awarded the Irving Langmuir Award in 1987. He is a member of the International Academy of Quantum Molecular Science. He became foreign member of the Royal Netherlands Academy of Arts and Sciences in 1991 and was elected a Foreign Member of the Royal Society (ForMemRS) in 2000. He is a recipient of the Christian B. Anfinsen Award, given in 2001. He was awarded the Linus Pauling Award in 2004 and the Nobel Prize in Chemistry in 2013.

== See also ==
- List of Jewish Nobel laureates
