= Russell J. Boyd =

Canadian chemist

Russell Jaye Boyd (born September 11, 1945) is a Canadian computational and theoretical chemist. He is Professor Emeritus at Dalhousie University in Halifax, Nova Scotia.

== Biography ==
=== Early life and education ===
Russell Jaye Boyd was born in Kelowna, British Columbia, on September 11, 1945. He attended Lester Pearson High School in New Westminster and subsequently enrolled in the Bachelor of Science program at the University of British Columbia. Boyd graduated in 1967 from the University of British Columbia with First-Class Honours in Chemistry and the Lefevre Gold Medal. Upon receiving his PhD in 1971 in Theoretical Chemistry from McGill University, he went to Oxford University as an NRC Postdoctoral Fellow with Charles Coulson at the Mathematical Institute. He returned to Canada as a Killam Postdoctoral Fellow in the Department of Chemistry at UBC from 1973 to 1975.

=== Career ===
Boyd joined Dalhousie University in 1975 and rose through the ranks to become a Full Professor in 1985. He served as Chair of the Department of Chemistry from 1992 to 2005 and was named a Killam Professor in 1997. In 2001 he became the seventh Alexander McLeod Professor of Chemistry. The McLeod Chair, one of the oldest named professorships in Canada, was created in 1884. He was awarded the status of Professor Emeritus in 2013. He served as Associate Vice-President Research from 2006 to 2011.

He has published about 290 peer-reviewed papers and review chapters in computational and theoretical chemistry, which have collected over 11,000 citations. In 2007, Boyd co-edited The Quantum Theory of Atoms in Molecules: From Solid State to DNA and Drug Design. He has supervised the research of 25 PhD students, more than 25 postdoctoral fellows and senior visitors, and a comparable number of undergraduate students. Fourteen former members of his group hold academic appointments in Canadian universities and another ten hold similar appointments abroad. He was the Research Director and Principal Investigator of the Atlantic Computational Excellence Network from 2010 to 2014.

=== Awards and honors ===
Professor Boyd is the only elected Canadian member of the Scientific Board of the World Association of Theoretical and Computational Chemists (WATOC) and is Chair of the 12th Triennial Congress of WATOC. He is a Fellow of the Chemical Institute of Canada and received the prestigious 2009 Montreal Medal of the Chemical Institute of Canada in recognition of his distinguished contributions to the profession of chemistry in Canada. His many professional activities include serving as Editor for Theoretical Chemistry of the Canadian Journal of Chemistry from 1988 to 1998, President of the Canadian Society for Chemistry for 2007-2008, and Chair of The Chemical Institute of Canada for 2012-2013. He was elected to the Bureau of the International Union of Pure and Applied Chemistry in 2013.

He has served on five committees (two as Chair) of the Natural Sciences and Engineering Research Council (NSERC) of Canada and numerous national selection committees including the Steacie Prize for Natural Sciences, the Killam Selection Committee of the Canada Council, the Adjudication Committee of the Canada-Fulbright Program, the Canadian Science and Engineering Hall of Fame, and the NSF (USA) Science and Technology Centers Selection Panel.

In light of his extensive achievements and impact on the field of chemistry, there have been two occasions on which a special issue of the Canadian Journal of Chemistry has been published in his honour with contributions from many international research groups.

== Publications ==
Selected Publications: Relative Sizes of the High and Low Spin States of Atoms, R.J. Boyd, Nature 250, 566-567 (1974); A Quantum Mechanical Explanation for Hund's Multiplicity Rule, R.J. Boyd, Nature, 310, 480-481 (1984); Selenium Stories, R.J. Boyd, Nature Chemistry, 3, 570 (2011).
