= Q-Chem =

Computational chemistry software package

- Developers: Q-Chem Inc., Q-Chem developer community
- Stable release: 6.2.2 / 21 November 2024; 23 months ago
- Written in: Fortran, C, C++
- Operating system: Linux, FreeBSD, Unix and like operating systems, Microsoft Windows, Mac OS X
- Type: Ab initio quantum chemistry, Density functional theory, QM/MM, AIMD, Computational chemistry
- License: Commercial, academic
- Website: www.q-chem.com

Q-Chem is a general-purpose electronic structure package featuring a variety of established and new methods implemented using algorithms that enable fast calculations of large systems on various computer architectures. It is compatible with laptops, regular lab workstations, midsize clusters, and cloud computing and uses density functional and/or wave-function based approaches. It offers an integrated graphical interface and input generator; a large selection of functionals and correlation methods, including methods for electronically excited states and open-shell systems; solvation models; and wave-function analysis tools. In addition to serving the computational chemistry community, Q-Chem also provides a versatile code development platform.

== History ==
Q-Chem software is maintained and distributed by Q-Chem, Inc., located in Pleasanton, California, USA. It was founded in 1993 as a result of disagreements within the Gaussian company that led to the departure (and subsequent "banning") of John Pople and a number of his students and postdocs (see Gaussian License Controversy).

The first lines of the Q-Chem code were written by Peter Gill, at that time a postdoc of Pople, during a winter vacation (December 1992) in Australia. Gill was soon joined by Benny Johnson (a Pople graduate student) and Carlos Gonzalez (another Pople postdoc), but the latter left the company shortly thereafter. In mid-1993, Martin Head-Gordon, formerly a Pople student, but at that time on the Berkeley tenure track, joined the growing team of academic developers.

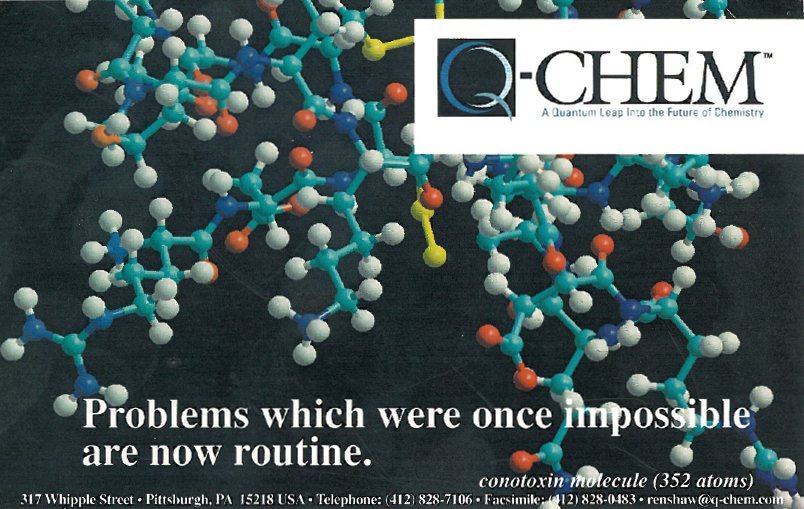
Postcard advertising the release of Q-Chem 1.0.

In preparation for the first commercial release, the company hired Eugene Fleischmann as marketing director and acquired its URL www.q-chem.com in January 1997. The first commercial product, Q-Chem 1.0, was released in March 1997. Advertising postcards celebrated the release with the proud headline, "Problems which were once impossible are now routine"; however, version 1.0 had many shortcomings, and a wit once remarked that the words "impossible" and "routine" should probably be interchanged! However, vigorous code development continued, and by the following year Q-Chem 1.1 was able to offer most of the basic quantum chemical functionality as well as a growing list of features (the continuous fast multipole method, J-matrix engine, COLD PRISM for integrals, and G96 density functional, for example) that were not available in any other package.

Following a setback when Johnson left, the company became more decentralized, establishing and cultivating relationships with an ever-increasing circle of research groups in universities around the world. In 1998, Fritz Schaefer accepted an invitation to join the Board of Directors and, early in 1999, as soon as his non-compete agreement with Gaussian had expired, John Pople joined as both a Director and code developer.

In 2000, Q-Chem established a collaboration with Wavefunction Inc., which led to the incorporation of Q-Chem as the ab initio engine in all subsequent versions of the Spartan package. The Q-Chem Board was expanded in March 2003 with the addition of Anna Krylov and Jing Kong. In 2012, John Herbert joined the Board and Fritz Schaefer became a Member Emeritus. The following year, Shirin Faraji joined the Board; Peter Gill, who had been President of Q-Chem since 1988, stepped down; and Anna Krylov became the new president. In 2022-23 Yuezhi Mao and Joonho Lee joined the board. The active Board of Directors currently consists of Lee, Mao, Faraji, Gill (past-President), Herbert, Krylov (President), and Hilary Pople (John's daughter). Martin Head-Gordon remains a Scientific Advisor to the Board.

Currently, there are thousands of Q-Chem licenses in use, and Q-Chem's user base is expanding, as illustrated by citation records for releases 2.0, 3.0, and 4.0, which reached 400 per year in 2016 (see Figure 2).

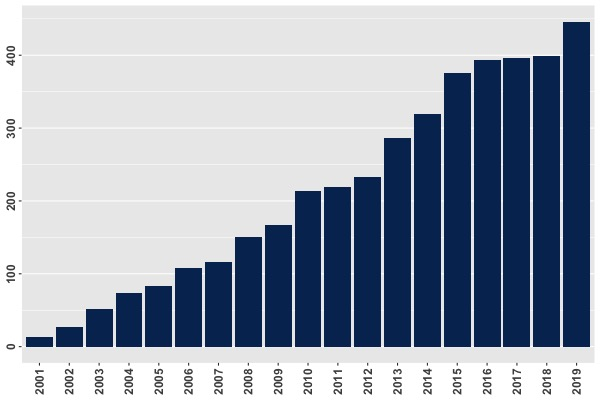
Fig. 2. Citations to Q-Chem: 2001 to 2019.

Q-Chem has been used as an engine in high-throughput studies, such as the Harvard Clean Energy Project, in which about 350,000 calculations were performed daily on the IBM World Community Grid.

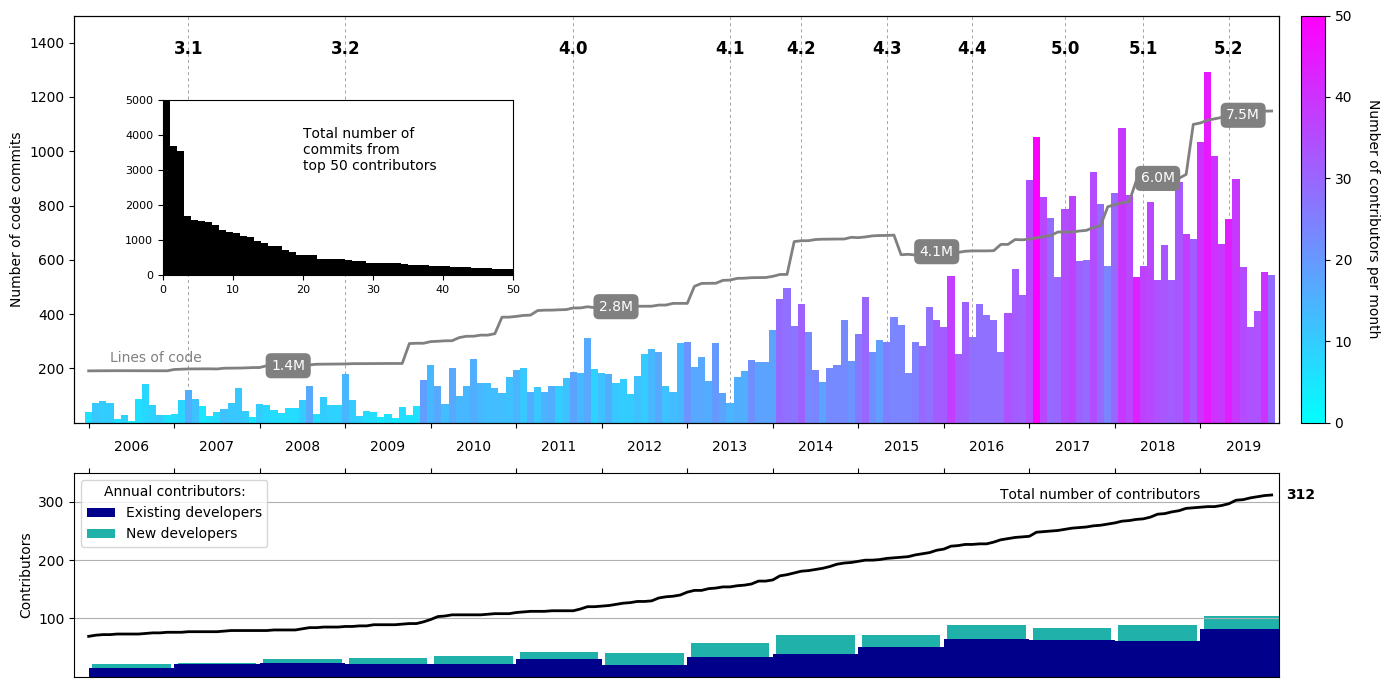
Figure 3. Statistics of Q-Chem developer activity since 2006. Top chart: Total number of code commits (height of bars) and number of developers contributing (color of bar) by month. Bottom chart: Growth of developer base, showing existing and new developers each month. A steady growth of the developer base can be seen. The inset depicts the total number of commits by the 50 most-prolific developers, showing contributions by full-time team (> 2000 commits), the core developer team (500–2000 commits), and non-core developers (< 500 commits).

Innovative algorithms and new approaches to electronic structure have been enabling cutting-edge scientific discoveries. This transition, from in-house code to major electronic structure engine, has become possible due to contributions from numerous scientific collaborators; the Q-Chem business model encourages broad developer participation. Q-Chem defines its genre as open-teamware: its source code is open to a large group of developers. In addition, some Q-Chem modules are distributed as open source. Since 1992, over 400 man- (and woman-) years have been devoted to code development. Q-Chem 5.2.2, released in December 2019, consists of 7.5 million lines of code, which includes contributions by more than 300 active developers (current estimate is 312). See Figure 3.

== Features ==
Q-Chem can perform a number of general quantum chemistry calculations, such as Hartree–Fock, density functional theory (DFT) including time-dependent DFT (TDDFT), Møller–Plesset perturbation theory (MP2), coupled cluster (CC), equation-of-motion coupled-cluster (EOM-CC), configuration interaction (CI), algebraic diagrammatic construction (ADC), and other advanced electronic structure methods. Q-Chem also includes QM/MM functionality. Q-Chem 4.0 and higher releases come with the graphical user interface, IQMol, which includes a hierarchical input generator, a molecular builder, and general visualization capabilities (MOs, densities, molecular vibrations, reaction pathways, etc.). IQMol is developed by Andrew Gilbert (in coordination with Q-Chem) and is distributed as free open-source software. IQmol is written using the Qt libraries, enabling it to run on a range of platforms, including OS X, Widows, and Linux. It provides an intuitive environment to set up, run, and analyze Q-Chem calculations. It can also read and display a variety of file formats, including the widely available formatted checkpoint format. A complete, up-to-date list of features is published on the Q-Chem website and in the user manual.

In addition, Q-Chem is interfaced with WebMO and is used as the computing engine in Spartan, or as a back-end to CHARMM, GROMACS, NAMD, and ChemShell. Other popular visualization programs such as Jmol and Molden can also be used.

In 2018, Q-Chem established a partnership with BrianQC, produced by StreamNovation, Ltd., a new integral engine exploiting the computational power of GPUs. The BrianQC plug-in speeds up Q-Chem calculations by taking advantage of GPUs on mixed architectures, which is highly efficient for simulating large molecules and extended systems. BrianQC is the first GPU Quantum Chemistry software capable of calculating high angular momentum orbitals.

=== Ground-state self-consistent-field methods ===
- Restricted, unrestricted, and restricted open-shell formulations
- Analytical first and second derivatives for geometry optimizations, harmonic frequency analysis, and ab initio molecular dynamics
- Efficient algorithms for fast convergence
- Variety of guess options (including MOM)

=== Density functional theory ===
- Variety of local, GGA, mGGA, hybrid, double-hybrid, dispersion-corrected, range separated functionals (energies and analytic first and second derivatives)
- TDDFT and spin-flip-TDDFT formulations (energies, gradients, and frequencies)
- Constrained DFT

=== Innovative algorithms for faster performance and reduced scaling of integral calculations, HF/DFT and many-body methods ===
- Dual basis
- Resolution of identity
- Cholesky decomposition of electron-repulsion integrals
- Continuous Fast Multipole Method (CFMM)
- Fast numerical integration of exchange-correlation with mrXC (multiresolution exchange-correlation)
- Linear-scaling HF-exchange method (LinK)
- Fourier transform Coulomb method (FTC)
- COLD PRISM and J-matrix engine
- Mixed-precision arithmetic for correlated methods

=== Post Hartree–Fock methods ===
- MP2 (including RI-MP2, energies and analytic gradients)
- SCS, SOS-MP2, and OO-MP2
- CCD, QCISD, CCSD, OOCCD, VOOCCD
- (T), (2), (dT), and (fT) corrections
- EOM-XX-CCSD methods for open-shell and electronically excited species (XX=EE, SF, IP, EA, DIP, DEA, 2SF; energies, properties, and gradients for most methods), including complex-valued variants for treating resonances (states metastable with respect to electron detachment)
- Extensions of DFT and many-body methods to treat core-level states and related spectroscopies
- ADC methods
- CIS, TDDFT, CIS(D), and SOS-CIS(D) methods for excited states
- Variety of implicit solvent models
- Wave-function analysis tools enabled by libwfa developed by Felix Plasser and co-workers

=== QM/MM and QM/EFP methods for extended systems ===
- Janus QM/MM interface
- YinYang Atom model without linked atoms
- ONIOM model
- EFP method (including library of effective fragments, EFP interface with CC/EOM, DFT/TDDFT, and other methods)

== Version history ==
Beginning with Q-Chem 2.0 only major releases versions are shown.

- Q-Chem 1.0: March 1997
- Q-Chem 1.1: 1997
- Q-Chem 1.2 1998
- Q-Chem 2.0: 2000
- Q-Chem 3.0: 2006
- Q-Chem 4.0: February 2012
- Q-Chem 5.0: June 2017
- Q-Chem 5.2.2: December 2019
- Q-Chem 5.3.2: December 2020
- Q-Chem 5.4: June 2021
- Q-Chem 5.4.1: August 2021
- Q-Chem 5.4.2: December 2021
- Q-Chen 6.0: July 2022
- Q-Chem 6.1.0: December 2022
- Q-Chem 6.1.1: December 2023
- Q-Chem 6.2.0: May 2024
- Q-Chem 6.2.2: November 2024

== See also ==
- Quantum chemistry computer programs
- ADF
- CHARMM
- CP2K
- GAMESS (US)
- GAMESS (UK)
- Gaussian (software)
- MOLCAS
- MOLPRO
- MPQC
- NWChem
- ORCA
- Psi3
- Firefly
- Quantemol
- Spartan
- TeraChem
- TURBOMOLE
