= Michael Bühl =

Scottish chemist

Michael Buehl
- Born: Michael Bühl
- Education: University of Erlangen-Nuremberg; University of Georgia
- Scientific career
- Fields: Computational Chemistry
- Workplaces: University of St. Andrews; University of Wuppertal; University of Zürich
- Doctoral advisor: Paul von Ragué Schleyer
- Website: chemistry.st-andrews.ac.uk/staff/buehl/group/

Michael Bühl is a professor of Computational and Theoretical Chemistry in the School of Chemistry, University of St. Andrews. He has published work on the performance of various density functionals, modelling thermal and medium effects, transition-metal NMR of metalloenzymes, modelling of homogeneous catalysis, and molecular dynamics of transition metal complexes.

== Biography ==
Bühl was born in 1962. He earned his PhD at the University of Erlangen-Nuremberg's Institute for Organic Chemistry (Institut für organische Chemie), where his thesis advisor was Paul von Ragué Schleyer. In 1992, he worked as a post-doctoral researcher with Henry F. Schaefer III (University of Georgia). He was an Oberassistent at the Institute of Organic Chemistry, University of Zürich between 1993 and 1999. In 1999, he also worked at Max-Planck-Institut für Kohlenforschung, Mülheim. He was on the faculty at the University of Zürich from 1998 to 2000 and then at University of Wuppertal from 2000 to 2008. He is Chair of Computational Chemistry at the University of St. Andrews since 2008.

== Research interests ==
Bühl's group applies the tools of computational quantum chemistry to study a variety of chemical and biochemical systems and their properties, focussing on transition-metal and f-element chemistry, homogeneous and bio-catalysis, and NMR properties. The methods employed are mostly rooted in density-functional theory (DFT), including quantum-mechanical/molecular-mechanical (QM/MM) calculations and first-principles molecular dynamics simulations.
