= Leticia González (chemist) =

Theoretical chemist

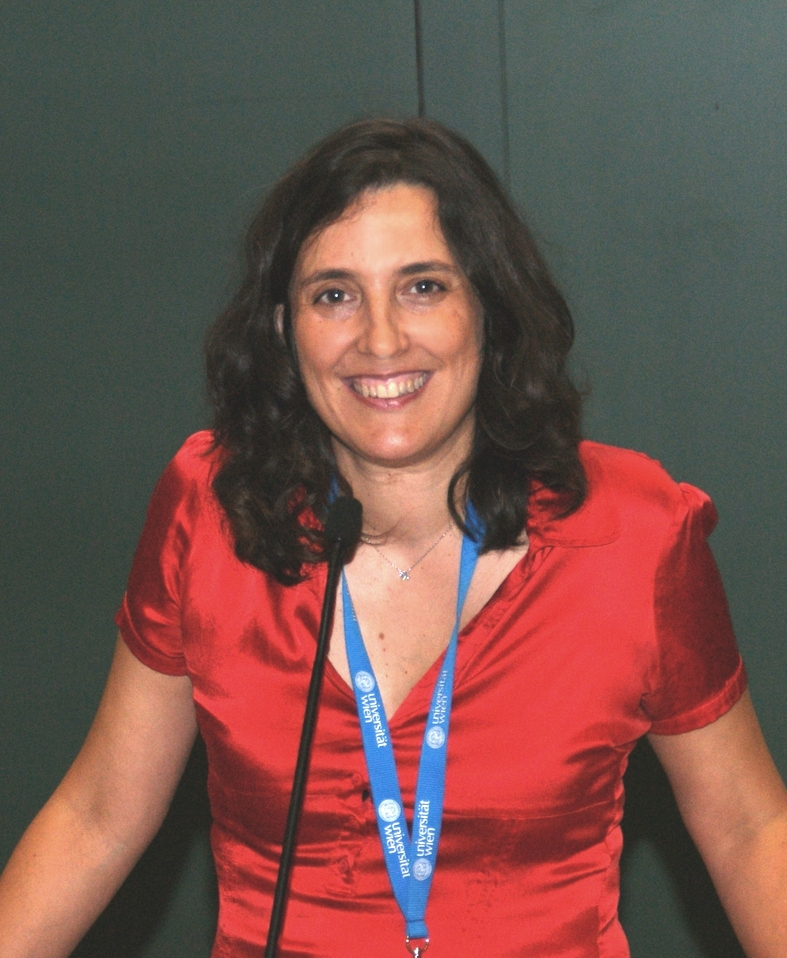
- González in 2014
- Born: Leticia González Herrero; 17 March 1971 (age 55); Madrid, Spain
- Education: Autonomous University of Madrid
- Known for: Excited state computations
- Scientific career
- Fields: Theoretical Chemistry
- Workplaces: University of Vienna

Leticia González Herrero (born 17 March 1971) is a Spanish theoretical chemist, known for her work on molecular excited states, especially ultrafast dynamics of DNA nucleobases and highly accurate simulations of transition metal complexes.

== Biography ==
Leticia González was born in Madrid, where she studied chemistry from 1989 to 1994 at the Autonomous University of Madrid. In 1995, she earned her master's degree from King's College London. She returned to Autonomous University of Madrid for her PhD, which she earned in 1998. She then moved to the Free University of Berlin and completed her Habilitation in 2004. In 2007, she was appointed Professor for Theoretical and Physical Chemistry at the University of Jena. In 2011, she became Full Professor for Computational Chemistry, Theoretical Chemistry and Scientific Computing at the University of Vienna.

== Honours and awards ==
- 2018: Doctor Honoris Causa of the University of Lorraine
- 2014: Löwdin lecturer
- 2011: Dirac Medal of the WATOC (World Association of Theoretical Chemists)
- 2006: Heisenberg Stipendium, Deutsche Forschungsgemeinschaft (DFG)
- 2005: Guest Professorship Award, Berliner Frauenförderung
- 2005: SIGMA-ALDRICH Award for best Young Researchers, Spanish Royal Society of Chemistry, Spain
- 1999: Alexander von Humboldt Fellowship
- 1999: Premio Extraordinario de Doctorado 1998/1999 (Best PhD Thesis year 1998/1999), Faculty of Sciences, Universidad Autónoma de Madrid
