= Leo Radom =

Australian computational chemist

Leo Radom AC
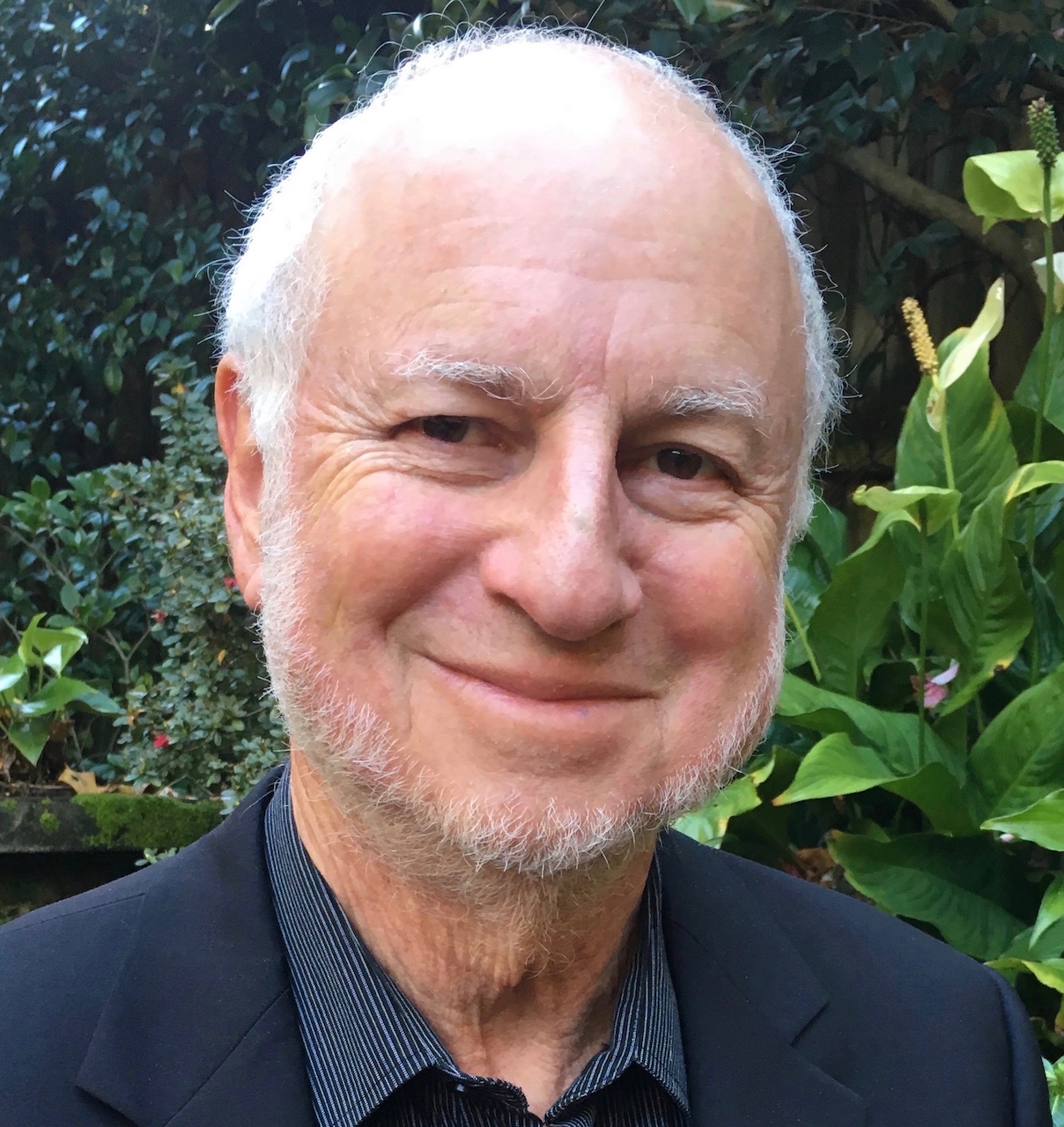
- Born: 13 December 1944 (age 81); Shanghai, China
- Education: University of Sydney
- Scientific career
- Fields: Computational chemistry
- Workplaces: Carnegie Mellon University; Australian National University; University of Sydney
- Doctoral advisor: Raymond Le Fèvre; Sever Sternhell
- Other academic advisors: John Pople
- Doctoral students: Peter Gill

Leo Radom AC (born 13 December 1944) is an Australian computational chemist. He is a Emeritus Professor of Chemistry at the University of Sydney. He attended North Sydney Boys High School. He has a PhD and a DSc from the University of Sydney and carried out postdoctoral research under the late Sir John Pople. Previously, he was Professor at the Research School of Chemistry at the Australian National University in Canberra, Australia. He has published over 460 papers.

He is fellow of the Australian Academy of Science (1988) and in 2008 was awarded its Craig Medal for contributions of a high order to any branch of chemistry by active researchers. He is a member of the International Academy of Quantum Molecular Science (1989). Until 2011, he was President of the World Association of Theoretical and Computational Chemists (WATOC) and organised the WATOC 2008 Conference in Sydney, Australia.

== Awards and honours ==
In 2001, Radom was awarded the Centenary Medal "for service to Australian society and science in computational quantum chemistry". In 2019, Radom was appointed a Companion of the Order of Australia "for eminent service to science, particularly to computational chemistry, as an academic, author and mentor, and to international scientific bodies".
