= Journal of Computational Chemistry =

- Discipline: Chemistry
- Language: English
- Edited by: Charles L. Brooks III, Gernot Frenking, Masahiro Ehara, Peter R. Schreiner

Publication details
- History: 1980–present
- Publisher: John Wiley & Sons
- Frequency: 16/year
- Impact factor: 3.376 (2020)

Standard abbreviations
- ISO 4: J. Comput. Chem.

Indexing
- CODEN: JCCHDD
- ISSN: 0192-8651 (print); 1096-987X (web)
- LCCN: 80643914
- OCLC no.: 05081734

Links
- Journal homepage

The Journal of Computational Chemistry is a peer-reviewed scientific journal published since 1980 by John Wiley & Sons. It covers research, contemporary developments in theory and methodology, and applications in all areas of computational chemistry, including ab initio quantum chemistry methods and semiempirical methods, density functional theory, molecular mechanics, molecular dynamics, statistical mechanics, cheminformatics, biomolecular structure prediction, molecular design, and bioinformatics.

According to the Journal Citation Reports, the journal has a 2020 impact factor of 3.376, ranking it 80th out of 179 journals in the category "Chemistry, Multidisciplinary".
