= Planar hexacoordinate carbon =

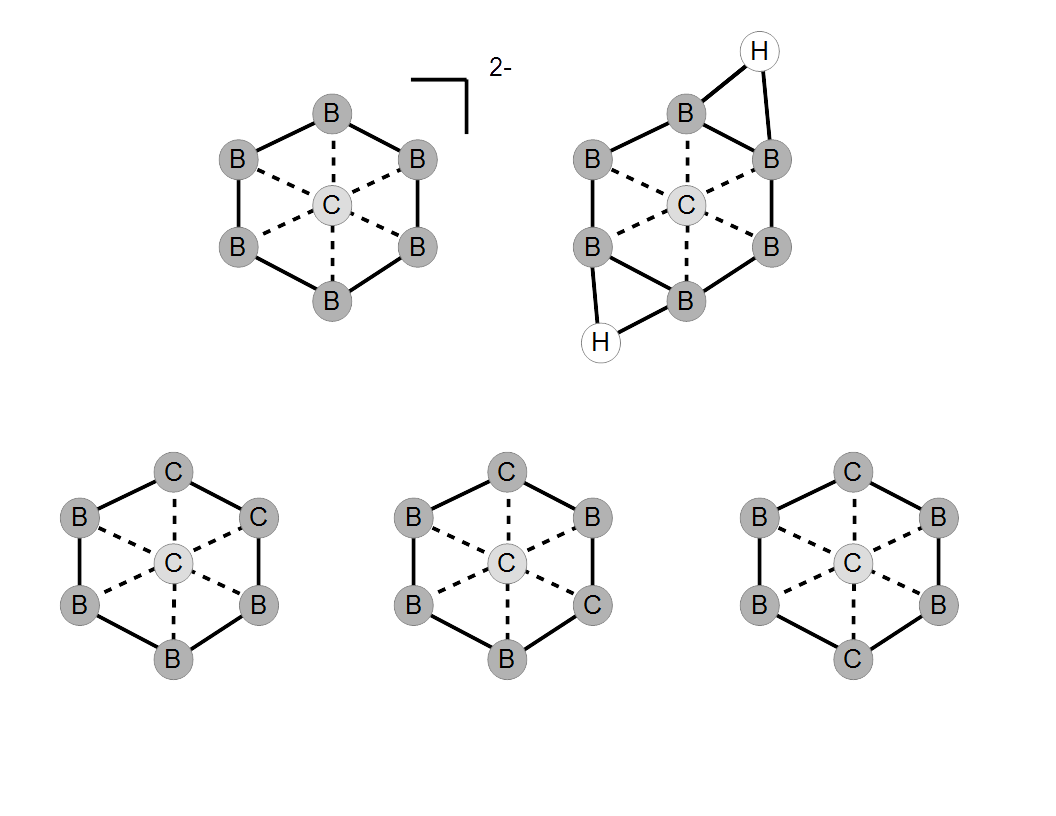
Planar hexacoordinate carbon

Planar hexacoordinate carbon in chemistry describes a molecular geometry featuring a planar arrangement of carbon with six surrounding atoms. No actual chemical compounds having this particular hexacoordinate configuration have been reported but quantum mechanical methods have demonstrated that these molecules are a possibility. Examples of molecules investigated with computational methods are the B_{6}C dianion, the CN_{3}Be_{3}^{+} ion, the CO_{3}Li_{3}^{+} ion and the CN_{3}Mg_{3}^{+} ion. A simulated Be_{2}C monolayer is reported to consist of quasi-planar hexacoordinate carbon atoms.

On the other hand, experimental research has confirmed that the pentagonal-pyramidal dication obtained from hexamethyl Dewar benzene, C_{6}(CH_{3})_{6}^{2+}, contains a hexacoordinate carbon atom. Furthermore, a heptacoordinate carbon atom has been predicted to be involved in a stable hexagonal-pyramidal configuration of tropylium trication, (C_{7}H_{7})^{3+}.
