= Wanda Andreoni =

Italian and Swiss physical chemist

Wanda Andreoni (born 1949) is an Italian and Swiss physical chemist known for her research in ab initio quantum chemistry methods for reactions and molecular dynamics on surfaces and in microclusters. She is a professor emeritus and honorary professor at the École Polytechnique Fédérale de Lausanne (EPFL) in Switzerland.

== Education and career ==
Andreoni was born in 1949 in Ancona, in Italy; she is an Italian and Swiss citizen. She was educated at the Sapienza University of Rome.

After previous positions at Sapienza University, Bell Labs, the University of Geneva, and EPFL, she joined the Zurich laboratory of IBM Research in 1986. There, she became project leader for computational chemistry and physics in 1994, manager for computational biochemistry and materials science in 1995, and program manager of deep computing applications in 2005.

In 2009 she moved to EPFL as director of the Centre Européen de Calcul Atomique et Moléculaire, continuing as director until 2012. She was given a full professorship at EPFL in 2010, as chair of computational chemical physics; she held this chair until retiring as a professor emeritus and honorary professor in 2015.

== Recognition ==
IBM gave Andreoni their Technical Achievement Award in 1993 and 2007, and elected her to the IBM Academy of Technology in 1999. She was elected as a Fellow of the American Physical Society (APS) in 2005, after a nomination from the APS Division of Computational Physics, "for important contributions to the development and implementation of ab-initio computational methods, and for pioneering investigations that led to deep insights into the behavior of diverse condensed matter, chemical, and biomolecular systems".

She was a 2008 recipient of the Marisa Bellisario Prize. In 2011 she visited the University of Groningen as Zernike Chair.
