= Wiley Interdisciplinary Reviews: Computational Molecular Science =

- Discipline: Chemistry
- Language: English
- Edited by: Peter R. Schreiner

Publication details
- History: 2011–present
- Publisher: John Wiley & Sons (United Kingdom)
- Frequency: Bimonthly
- Open access: Hybrid
- Impact factor: 11.4 (2022)

Standard abbreviations
- ISO 4: Wiley Interdiscip. Rev. Comput. Mol. Sci.

Indexing
- CODEN: WIRCAH
- ISSN: 1759-0876 (print); 1759-0884 (web)

Links
- Journal homepage; Online access; Online archive

Wiley Interdisciplinary Reviews: Computational Molecular Science is a bimonthly peer-reviewed scientific journal, published since 2011 by John Wiley & Sons. It provides a forum for review-type articles that are broadly accessible to a diverse audience of scientists and engineers. The current Editor-in-Chief is Peter R. Schreiner (Justus-Liebig-University).

According to the Journal Citation Reports, the journal has a 2021 impact factor of 11.500, ranking it 21st out of 179 journals in the category "Chemistry, Multidisciplinary" and 2nd out of 57 journals in the category "Mathematical & Computational Biology".
