= Evelyn Glick =

American golfer and philanthropist

- Born: December 1910; Leonardtown
- Died: October 14, 1998; Baltimore
- Occupation: Golfer

Evelyn Grollman Glick (December 1910 – October 14, 1998) was an American golfer and philanthropist. She was a dominant player in women's golf in the 1940s, 1950s, and 1960s.

She was born Evelyn Grollman in Leonardtown, Maryland, the daughter of Simon Grollman and Bessie Flora Karp Grollman. She graduated from Western High School in Baltimore, Maryland, and the Maryland State Normal School, then became a teacher in Baltimore area elementary schools. In 1931 she married Maurice Glick, a lawyer and real estate agent.

Glick did not take up golfing until 1940, and she began playing regularly at the Woodholme Country Club, founded in 1927 by Baltimore's Eastern European Jewish community. The next year she was Woodholme's Women's Club champion, and went on to win so many championships around the eastern United States (and twice in Cuba) she was dubbed the "Collector of Titles". Glick was not known for the distance of her drives, never driving over 210 yards, but for the precision of her short game. She played with numerous golf legends, including Babe Didrikson Zaharias, whom she once led for 15 holes during an exhibition match. She retired from golf in 1968, but resumed the game in 1977 and kept playing until a stroke in 1997.

She was inducted into the Maryland State Athletic Hall of Fame in 1977, the Middle Atlantic Golf Association Hall of Fame in 1992, and the Maryland Golf Hall of Fame in 2021.

At the end of her life she and her estate donated millions, including creating a number of endowed chairs in medical fields in honor of her parents, her brothers, and herself: the Simon and Bessie Grollman Distinguished Professorship and Dr. Aaron I. Grollman Visiting Professorship at the University of Maryland School of Medicine, the Evelyn Grollman-Glick Professorship in Pharmaceutical Sciences at the University of Maryland School of Pharmacy, and the Evelyn Grollman Glick Chair in Experimental Medicine at Stony Brook University.

Glick died of a heart attack on October 14, 1998, at Johns Hopkins Hospital.
