= World Association of Theoretical and Computational Chemists =

Association of chemists

- Abbreviation: WATOC
- Formation: 1982
- President: Peter Gill
- Website: watoc.net
- Remarks: promoting the field of theoretical and computational chemistry

The World Association of Theoretical and Computational Chemists (WATOC) is a scholarly association founded in 1982 "in order to encourage the development and application of theoretical methods" in chemistry, particularly theoretical chemistry and computational chemistry. It was originally called the World Association of Theoretical Organic Chemists, but was later renamed the World Association of Theoretically Oriented Chemists, and in 2005 renamed once more to the World Association of Theoretical and Computational Chemists.

== Conferences ==
WATOC organizes a triennial world congress with over 1,000 participants in last years.

#	Name	Date	Year	City		Country	Organizer
1	WATOC-1987	August 12–18	1987		Budapest	Hungary	Imre Csizmadia
2	WATOC-1990	July 8–14	1990		Toronto	Canada	Imre Csizmadia
3	WATOC-1993	July 18–25	1993		Toyohashi	Japan	Keiji Morokuma
4	WATOC-1996	July 7–12	1996		Jerusalem	Israel	Amiram Goldblum
5	WATOC-1999	August 1–6	1999		London	UK	Mike Robb; Henry Rzepa
6	WATOC-2002	August 6–9	2002		Lugano	Switzerland	Hans-Peter Lüthi
7	WATOC-2005	January 16–21	2005		Cape Town	South Africa	Kevin Naidoo
8	WATOC-2008	September 14–19	2008		Sydney	Australia	Leo Radom
9	WATOC-2011	July 17–22	2011		Santiago de Compostela	Spain	Manuel Yáñez; Otilia Mó
10	WATOC-2014	October 5–10	2014		Santiago de Chile	Chile	Alejandro Toro-Labbé
11	WATOC-2017	August 27 – September 1	2017		Munich	Germany	Christian Ochsenfeld
12	WATOC-2020	August 16 – 21	2020	Vancouver-bridge	Vancouver	Canada	Russell J. Boyd
13	WATOC-2025	June 22 – 27	2025	Downtown Oslo	Oslo	Norway	Trygve Helgaker

== Awards ==
The association awards two yearly medals: the Schrödinger Medal to one "outstanding theoretical and computational chemist", and the Dirac Medal to one "outstanding theoretical and computational chemist under the age of 40".

=== Recipients of the Dirac Medal ===
Source: WATOC

- 1998: Timothy J. Lee
- 1999: Peter M. W. Gill
- 2000: Jiali Gao
- 2001: Martin Kaupp
- 2002: Jerzy Cioslowski
- 2003: Peter Schreiner
- 2004: Jan Martin
- 2005: Ursula Röthlisberger
- 2006: Lucas Visscher
- 2007: Anna Krylov
- 2008: Kenneth Ruud
- 2009: Jeremy Harvey
- 2010: Daniel Crawford
- 2011: Leticia González
- 2012: Paul Ayers
- 2013: Filipp Furche
- 2014: Denis Jacquemin
- 2015: Edward Valeev
- 2016: Johannes Neugebauer
- 2017: Francesco Evangelista
- 2018: Erin Johnson
- 2019: Satoshi Maeda
- 2020: Alexandre Tkatchenko
- 2021: Edit Matyus
- 2022: Katharina Boguslawski
- 2023: Thomas Jagau
- 2024: Alexander Sokolov
- 2025: Giuseppe Barca
- 2026: Wenjie Dou

== List of presidents ==
Presidents of WATOC:

#	Name		First year	Last year
1	Imre Csizmadia, taken in 1987 at the WATOC conference	Imre Gyula Csizmadia	1987	1990
2	Paul Schleyer taken in 1987	Paul von Rague Schleyer	1990	1996
3		Henry F. Schaefer, III	1996	2005
4	Leo Radom	Leo Radom	2005	2011
5		Walter Thiel	2011	2017
6		Peter Gill	2017	2025
7		Martin Head-Gordon	2025	
