= B. Montgomery Pettitt =

American scientist

B. Montgomery "Monte" Pettitt
- Citizenship: American
- Education: University of Houston
- Scientific career
- Workplaces: University of Texas Medical Branch, Baylor College of Medicine
- Academic advisors: Martin Karplus (Harvard University) Peter J. Rossky (University of Texas)

B. Montgomery "Monte" Pettitt is the Director of the Sealy Center for Structural Biology and Molecular Biophysics at University of Texas Medical Branch in Galveston, Texas, holder of the Robert A. Welch Distinguished Chair in Chemistry, and tenured Professor in the Department of Biochemistry and Molecular Biology, as well as the department of Pharmacology and Toxicology. He is also affiliated with and former director of The W. M. Keck Center at Rice University, and a faculty member of the Structural and Computational Biology and Molecular Biophysics program at Baylor College of Medicine. At the University of Houston, he was the Hugh Roy and Lille Cranz Cullen Distinguished Professor of Chemistry and Robert A. Welch Chair in Chemistry, as well as the director of its Institute for Molecular Design.

== Early life and education ==
He received his B.S. in Chemistry and Mathematics at the University of Houston in December 1975, and his Ph.D. in Physical Chemistry from the University of Houston in May 1980. He was a Postdoctoral Fellow at the University of Texas at Austin (1980-1983) under the tutelage of Dr. Peter J. Rossky and then at Harvard University (1983-1985) under the tutelage of Nobel Laureate, Dr. Martin Karplus.

== Career ==
In 2004, he was affiliated with the Institute for Molecular Design at the University of Houston, The W.M. Keck Center at Rice University and the Ph.D. program in Structural and Computational Biology and Molecular Biophysics at Baylor College of Medicine. He is the author of over 200 peer-reviewed journal articles.

== Selected publications ==
- Myers, Christopher; Pettitt BM (2013). "Communication: Origin of the contributions to DNA structure in phages". J. Chem. Phys. 138 (7): 071103–071104. Bibcode:2013JChPh.138g1103M. doi:10.1063/1.4791708. PMC 3592880. PMID 23444988.
- Feng, Jun; Lynch GC; Pettitt BM (2012). "Studying Proteins and Peptides at Material Surfaces". Innovations in Biomolecular Modeling and Simulations. Royal Society of Chemistry. pp. 293–320. doi:10.1039/9781849735049-00293. ISBN 978-1-84973-461-5.
- Fogg, Jonathan; Randall GL; Pettitt BM; Sumners DL; Harris SA; Zechiedrich L (2012). "Bullied no more: when and how DNA shoves proteins around". Quarterly Reviews of Biophysics. 45 (3): 257–299. doi:10.1017/S0033583512000054. PMC 4866820. PMID 22850561.
- "Structural Basis for the Activity of pp60 c src Protein Tyrosine Kinase Inhibitors" Biopolymers, 59 167-179 (2001); N.V. Prabhu, S.A. Siddiqui, J.S. McMurray and B. M. Pettitt.
- "A Study of DNA tethered to a Surface by an All-atom Molecular Dynamics Simulation" Theo. Chem. Accounts 106 233-235 (2001); Ka-Yiu Wong and B.M. Pettitt.
- "Numerical Simulation of the Sedimentation of a Tripole-like body in an incompressible Viscous Fluid" Applied Math. Lett. 15 743-747 (2002); L. H. Juarez, R. Glowinski, B. M. Pettitt.
- "Simulations of the Bis-Penicillamine Enkephalin in Sodium Chloride Solution: A Parameter Study" Biopolymers 60 134-152 (2001); Gail Marlow and B. M. Pettitt.
- "Fine tuning function: Correlation of hinge domain interactions with functional dis- tinctions between LacI and PurR " Protein Science 11 778-794 (2002); Liskin Swint- Kruse, C. Larson, B. M. Pettitt and K.S. Matthews.
- "Computationally useful bridge diagram series II. Diagrams in h-bonds," J. Chem. Phys. 116 9404-9413 (2002); John Perkyns, Kippi Dyer and B. M. Pettitt.
- "Computationally useful bridge diagram series III. Lennard-Jones mixtures," J. Chem. Phys. 116 9413-9422 (2002); Kippi Dyer, John Perkyns, and B. M. Pettitt.
- "Solvation and Hydration of Proteins and Nucleic acids: a Theoretical View of Simu- lation and Experiment" Accounts of Chemical Res. 35 376- 384 (2002); V. Makarov, B.M. Pettitt and M. Feig.
- "Coulomb Blockage of Hybridization in Two-Dimensional DNA Arrays" Phys. Rev. E 66, 41905 (2002); A. Vainrub and B.M. Pettitt.
