= Benoît Roux =

Canadian biochemist

- Education: University of Montreal; Harvard University
- Awards: Rutherford Memorial Medal; Fellow of the Biophysical Society of Canada; Fellow of the Royal Society of Canada
- Scientific career
- Fields: Biophysics
- Workplaces: University of Montreal; Cornell University; University of Chicago
- Thesis: Theoretical Study of Ion Transport in the Gramicidin A Channel (1990)
- Doctoral advisor: Martin Karplus
- Website: https://roux.lab.uchicago.edu/

Benoît Roux is an Amgen Professor of Biochemistry and Molecular Biophysics at the University of Chicago. He has previously taught at University of Montreal and Weill Medical College of Cornell University. Benoît Roux was a recipient of the 1998 Rutherford Memorial Medal in Chemistry, awarded by the Royal Society of Canada.

== Life and career ==
Roux obtained B.Sc. and M.Sc. in physics from the University of Montreal in 1981 and 1984 respectively. He completed his Ph.D. at Harvard University under the supervision of Martin Karplus, graduating in 1990. He served at the French Alternative Energies and Atomic Energy Commission from 1991 to 1992 and was a Foreign Research Fellow at the Centre D’Etudes. He was a faculty member in the department of physics at the Université de Montréal until 1999, when he relocated to Weill Cornell Medicine. He relocated to the department of biochemistry and molecular biology at the University of Chicago in 2005. He also serves as a research scientist at the Center for Nanoscale Materials, a department of the Argonne National Laboratory. He is an accomplished classical pianist, specializing in the work of Frédéric Chopin.

== Research ==
His laboratory at the University of Chicago mostly uses theoretical techniques, such as classical molecular dynamics, to understand the functioning of biological systems at the molecular level. His research has investigated structure, dynamics, and the function of biological macromolecular systems such as ion channels, receptors, and protein kinases.

He is a pioneer in the study of membrane proteins using molecular dynamics with explicit phospholipid molecules and solvent. His laboratory has also developed novel computational methods to improve efficiency and applicability of theoretical investigations to molecular recognition phenomena. His work has bridged theory and experiment in biophysics by employing ever-increasing computational power to further the understanding of the molecular basis of life.

== Works ==
In 1996, he co-authored Biological Membranes: A Molecular Perspective from Computation and Experiment with Kenneth M. Merz. In 2001, he co-edited a book with Oren M. Becker, Alexander D. MacKerell Jr., Benoit Roux, Masakatsu Watanabe, Computational Biochemistry and Biophysics. In 2021, he authored a text on biophysical theory and simulations, Computational Modeling and Simulations of Biomolecular Systems.

== Honors, awards, and fellowships ==
- Journal of Computational Chemistry: Special Issue on Membrane Protein Simulations and Free Energy Approaches in honor of Professor Benoit Roux's 60th birthday
- Rutherford Memorial Medal, Royal Society of Canada (1998)
- Fellow of the Biophysical Society of Canada (2017)
- Fellow of the Royal Society of Canada (2021)
- Fellow of the American Association for the Advancement of Science (2024)
- Kenneth S. Cole Award from the Channels, Receptors & Transporters Subgroup of the Biophysical Society (2024)
- John D. Ferry Lectureship in Macromolecular Science - UW Madison (2024)
