= Imre Gyula Csizmadia =

Hungarian chemist (1932–2022)

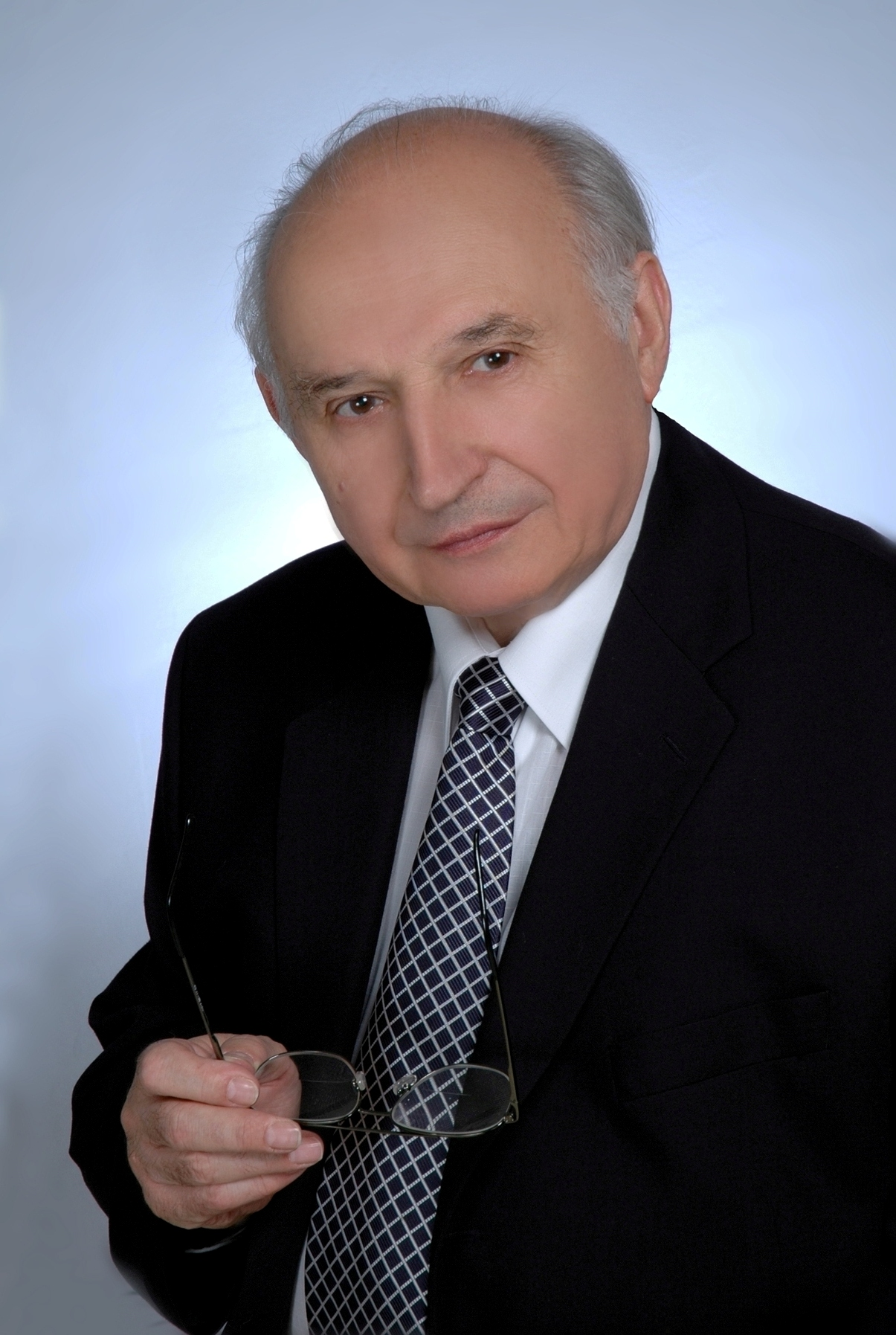
- Born: Csizmadia Imre Gyula; October 30, 1932; Budapest, Hungary
- Died: July 13, 2022 (aged 89); Budapest, Hungary
- Other name: IGC
- Education: Budapest University of Technology and Economics
- Known for: Quantum Chemistry
- Children: Valeria K Csizmadia
- Scientific career
- Fields: Chemistry
- Workplaces: University of Toronto, University of Szeged, University of Miskolc

Imre Gyula Csizmadia (October 30, 1932 – July 13, 2022) was a Canadian Hungarian chemist, university professor, external member of the Hungarian Academy of Sciences.

== Early life and education ==
Imre Gyula Csizmadia was born in Budapest on October 30, 1932. His early studies were determined by Márton Sain, who taught at the Lónyai Street Grammar School in Budapest, and Károly Benkő, a chemistry teacher from Szeghalom who fled from the Royal Hungarian Franz Joseph University in Cluj. During his university years at the Technical University of Budapest, he was most influenced by András Messmer, who taught theoretical chemistry at the university. He graduated as a chemical engineer in 1956, but continued his studies in physical organic chemistry at the University of British Columbia in Canada (M.Sc., 1959, Ph.D., 1962). During his post-doctoral period, he gained experience in quantum chemistry computing at MIT and the University Computer Centre in England (NATO Science Fellow, 1962–1964). In 1964, he was appointed Professor at the University of Toronto, where he has been involved in both research and teaching ever since.

In 2002, as a Szent-Györgyi scholarship holder, he spent a short period at ELTE and then at the University of Szeged (Hungary). He helped the research and teaching activities of the computational chemistry group led by Béla Viskolcz at the Department of Chemical Informatics (SZTE) as an emeritus professor until 2015. By his initiative, a summer school was created within which students from SZTE and University of Toronto mastered computational chemistry methods. Between 2015 and 2022, he helped to introduce computational chemistry research at the University of Miskolc.

Since then, he has been a visiting professor in many countries around the world: in Canada, Argentina, Japan, China, England, Germany, France, Spain, Italy and, of course, Hungary. He received honorary doctorate from the Eötvös Loránd University (1988), National University of San Luis (Argentina, 2007) and Semmelweis University (2022).

His main scientific activities are aimed at developing practical theoretical methods for drug design, in which he has already involved second year students. He used more effective, personalised, inspirational teaching techniques (inquiry-based learning/teaching) instead of the conventional so-called information-based teaching of knowledge transfer.

== Career ==
Together with Malcolm C. Harrison, Jules Moskowitz, and Brian Sutcliffe, he carried out the mathematical design of the POLYATOM program package and the development of the software. (POLYATOM was the first software package for ab initio calculations using Gaussian orbitals, developed in John C. Slater's Solid State and Molecular Theory Group.)

In 1968, he was the first to perform LCAO-MO-SCF ("ab initio") calculations on a formamide molecule using atom-centered Gaussian type (GTF) non-contracted basis functions, determining the ionization potential, dipole moment of the ground state molecule. Later, he studied the theoretical background of the stereochemical consequences of electron pairs and polar bonds in side-by-side positions (Edward-Lemieux, also known as the anomeric effect). He has experimentally investigated the mechanism of Wolff rearrangement, showing that the gas-phase Wolff rearrangement of α-keto carbons occurs via an oxy-oxygen intermediate state. He has demonstrated the thermodynamic and kinetic stability of the oxirene molecule formed during the mechanism by semiempirical (Hückel method) and ab initio calculations. In 1976, using the model compound PH5, he studied Berry pseudorotation (BPR) and turnstile rotation (TR) describing the intramolecular ligand exchange reaction of phosphoranes. Showing that the activation energy of the BPR mechanism is small (1.95 kcal/mol) while for TR it is much higher (10.5 kcal/mol). In 1978, together with M. R. Peterson, he carried out the first ab initio calculations and prepared a potential energy hyperplane for solving the n-butane conformational problems.

In 1985, he founded the Journal of Molecular Structure: THEOCHEM, a computational chemistry journal, and served as its editor until 2003 (the journal has been published bi-weekly as Computational and Theoretical Chemistry since 2011).

He was the first President of the World Association of Theoretical and Computational Chemists (WATOC) from 1987 to 1990. He organized the first WATOC conference in Budapest in 1987 (12–18 August) and the second in Toronto in 1990. Since then, WATOC has grown over the years into the largest theoretical and computational chemistry conference, held every three years.

His research interests were mainly in the field of theoretical organic chemistry, with a strong interest in the topology of potential hypersurfaces, mainly investigating the conformational behaviour of oligopeptides. In addition, he was also involved in the study of changes in biomolecules during oxidative stress and the study of protonation states of ground and excited states.

Till the end of his life, he was an active researcher, author and editor of a large number (550) of scientific publications and 14 books, and according to Web of Knowledge, his total references exceed 13,000, he considered his students to be his most important achievement. He received this guideline or philosophy of life from his mentor John C. Slater with whom he worked between from 1962 to 1964, and who also valued training the next generation of researchers more than building his own career.

== Interesting facts ==
His name appears in the acknowledgement of Cube (1997 film), a cult film of the late 1990s.

== Awards and honours ==
- Fellows of the Chemical Institute of Canada (1970)
- Member of European Academy (1979)
- Honorary Member of the Hungarian Chemical Society (1986)
- Honorary Doctorate, Eötvös Loránd University (1988)
- Honorary Professor at Tianjin Normal University (China) (1988)
- E.W.R. Steacie Award in Chemistry, The Chemical Institute of Canada (1990)
- President of the World Association of Theoretically Oriented Chemists (WATOC) (1985-1990)
- Angelo Mangini Gold Medal, the Italian Chemical Society (1992)
- Márton Kajtár Medal of the Kajtár Foundation (1999)
- elected External Member of the Hungarian Academy of Sciences (MTA) (2004)
- Honorary Doctorate from the National University of San Luis (Argentina) (2007)
- Honorary Doctorate from Semmelweis University (2012)

== Books ==
- Imre G. Csizmadia (1976). Theory and Practice of MO Calculations on Organic Molecules: Progress in Theoretical Organic Chemistry, Vol. 1. Elsevier Science Ltd. ISBN 978-0444414687.
- Imre G. Csizmadia (1977). Applications of MO Theory in Organic Chemistry; Progress in Theoretical Organic Chemistry, Volume 2.
- Imre G. Csizmadia; R. Daudel (1981). Computational Theoretical Organic Chemistry (NATO Science Series C: (closed)). Springer. ISBN 978-9027712707.
- I.G. Csizmadia (1982). Molecular Structure and Conformation: Recent Advances (Progress in Theoretical Organic Chemistry). Elsevier Science Ltd. ISBN 9780444420893.
- F. Bernardi; I.G. Csizmadia; A. Mangini (1985). Organic Sulphur Chemistry: Theoretical and Experimental Advances (Studies in Organic Chemistry). Elsevier Science Ltd. ISBN 978-0444424532.
- R. Poirier; R. Kari; I.G. Csizmadia (1985). Handbook of Gaussian Basis Sets. Elsevier science publishers. ISBN 0444424938.
- I.G. Csizmadia; A. Mangini; F. Bernardi (1985). Organic Sulfur Chemistry: Theoretical and Experimental Advances (Studies in Organic Chemistry, Volume 19). Elsevier Science Publishers.
- Juan Bertrán; Imre G. Csizmadia (1989). New Theoretical Concepts for Understanding Organic Reactions (Nato Science Series C: (closed)). Springer. ISBN 978-0792301516.
- Cemil Ögretir; Imre G. Csizmadia (1990). Computational Advances in Organic Chemistry: Molecular Structure and Reactivity (Nato Science Series C: (closed)). Springer. ISBN 978-0792310648.
- S.J. Formosinho; Imre G. Csizmadia; Luis G. Arnaut (1991). Theoretical and Computational Models for Organic Chemistry (NATO Science Series C: (closed)). Springer. ISBN 978-0792313144.
- F. Ruff; I.G. Csizmadia (1994). Organic Reactions: Equilibria, Kinetics and Mechanism (Studies in Organic Chemistry). Elsevier. ISBN 9780444881748.
- Imre G. Csizmadia (1997). Basic Principles for Introductory Organic Chemistry. Quirk Press. ISBN 9780968047132.
- Csizmadia G. Imre; Ruff Ferenc (2000). Szerves reakciómechanizmusok vizsgálata. Nemzeti Tankönyvkiadó. ISBN 9631903508.
- Imre G. Csizmadia; Botond Penke; Gábor Tóth (2004). The Role of Chemistry in the Evolution of Molecular Medicine. Elsevier Science. ISBN 978-0444515889.

== Additional information ==
- MTV Záróra, 2009. október 12. - Vendég: Csizmadia Imre
- Natursziget riport
- 2012-es Nyári egyetem
- Délmagyarország riport a Mindentudás Egyeteme alkalmából
- Biokompatibilis polimerek
