= Proteins (journal) =

Proteins: Structure, Function, and Bioinformatics
- Discipline: Protein biochemistry
- Language: English
- Edited by: Nikolay Dokholyan

Publication details
- History: 1986-present
- Publisher: John Wiley & Sons
- Frequency: Monthly
- Impact factor: 3.756 (2020)

Standard abbreviations
- ISO 4: Proteins

Indexing
- CODEN: PSFBAF
- ISSN: 1097-0134
- LCCN: 90655008
- OCLC no.: 13196210

Links
- Journal homepage; Online access; Online archive

Proteins: Structure, Function, and Bioinformatics is a monthly peer-reviewed scientific journal published by John Wiley & Sons, which was established in 1986 by Cyrus Levinthal. The journal covers research on all aspects protein biochemistry, including computation, function, structure, design, and genetics. The editor-in-chief is Nikolay Dokholyan (Penn State College of Medicine).

Publishing formats are original research reports, short communications, prediction reports, invited reviews, and topic proposals. In addition, Proteins includes a section entitled "Section Notes", describing novel protein structures.

== Abstracting and indexing ==
Proteins is abstracted and indexed in:

- Elsevier BIOBASE
- Biochemistry & Biophysics Citation Index
- Biological Abstracts
- BIOSIS Previews
- Biotechnology Citation Index
- Chemical Abstracts Service
- ChemWeb
- Current Contents/Life Sciences
- EMBASE
- Index Medicus/MEDLINE
- Science Citation Index
- Scopus

According to the Journal Citation Reports, the journal has a 2020 impact factor of 3.756.
