= Martin Head-Gordon =

Australian quantum chemist (born 1962)

Martin Head-Gordon FRS
- Born: Martin Paul Head; 17 March 1962 (age 64)
- Education: Monash University (BSc, MSc); Carnegie Mellon University (PhD)
- Known for: Q-Chem
- Spouse: Teresa Head-Gordon
- Awards: Member of the National Academy of Sciences (2015)
- Scientific career
- Fields: Theoretical chemistry Quantum chemistry Computational chemistry
- Workplaces: University of California, Berkeley
- Thesis: Direct ab initio molecular orbital methods for the study of large molecules (1989)
- Doctoral advisor: John Pople
- Doctoral students: Troy Van Voorhis
- Other notable students: Post-docs:
- Website: www.cchem.berkeley.edu/mhggrp

Martin Paul Head-Gordon (né Martin Paul Head) FRS is a professor of chemistry at the University of California, Berkeley, and Lawrence Berkeley National Laboratory working in the area of computational quantum chemistry. He is a member of the International Academy of Quantum Molecular Science.

== Education ==
A native of Australia, Head-Gordon received his Bachelor of Science and Master of Science degrees from Monash University, followed by a PhD from Carnegie Mellon University working under the supervision of John Pople developing a number of useful techniques including the Head-Gordon-Pople scheme for the evaluation of integrals, and the orbital rotation picture of orbital optimization.

== Career and research ==
At Berkeley, Head-Gordon supervises a group interested in pairing methods, local correlation methods, dual-basis methods, scaled MP2 methods, new efficient algorithms, and very recently corrections to the Kohn-Sham density functional framework. Head-Gordon is one of the founders of Q-Chem Inc.

=== Awards and honors ===
- 2011 Fellow of the American Academy of Arts and Sciences
- 2012 Fellow of the American Chemical Society
- 2015 Member of the National Academy of Sciences
- 2019 Fellow of the Royal Society
- 2020 Schrödinger Medal of the World Association of Theoretical and Computational Chemists
