= Schrödinger Medal =

The Schrödinger Medal is an annual award presented by the World Association of Theoretical and Computational Chemists for "one outstanding theoretical and computational chemist". Prior to 1991, winners were voted on by a committee to multiple chemists.

== Recipients ==
Year	Name	Citation
1987	Enrico Clementi	No reason cited.
1987	Raymond Daudel	No reason cited.
1987	Kenichi Fukui	No reason cited.
1987	William Lipscomb	No reason cited.
1987	Per-Olov Löwdin	No reason cited.
1987	Angelo Mangini	No reason cited.
1987	Yuri Ovchinnikov	No reason cited.
1987	John Pople	No reason cited.
1987	Bernard Pullman	No reason cited.
1987	Paul v. Ragué Schleyer	No reason cited.
1990	Michael J. S. Dewar	No reason cited.
1990	Roald Hoffmann	No reason cited.
1990	Camille Sandorfy	No reason cited.
1990	Henry F. Schaefer, III	No reason cited.
1991	Keiji Morokuma	"For his pioneering contributions to the development and application of theoretical and computational chemistry."
1992	Josef Michl	"For his novel contributions to the application of theoretical and computational chemistry, including organic photochemistry."
1993	Jan Almlöf	"For his insightful contributions to the development of efficient methods for quantum chemistry calculations, including direct methods."
1994	Leo Radom	"For his pioneering contributions to the application of computational chemistry."
1995	Werner Kutzelnigg	"For the development of theoretical methods in the fields of electron correlation, NMR computation, and relativistic quantum chemistry."
1996	Norman L. Allinger	"For his pioneering contributions to the development and application of molecular mechanics."
1997	Nicholas C. Handy	"As the leader of the contemporary renaissance in British theoretical chemistry vis his outstanding contributions to the methods of quantum chemistry and density functional theory"
1998	Kendall N. Houk	"For achievements in the development of theoretical concepts and applications of computational methods to the understanding of the origins of organic reactivity and stereoselectivity"
1999	Björn O. Roos	"For the development of important new theoretical methods, including the CASPT2 method, and for outstanding chemical applications to the excited electronic states of molecular systems"
2000	Axel Becke	"For the development of generalised gradient methods in density functional theory"
2001	Ernest R. Davidson	"For a wealth of pioneering contributions to molecular and quantum mechanics"
2002	Walter Thiel	"For the development of semi-empirical methods and the application to large chemical systems"
2003	Peter Pulay	"For his development of analytic gradient methods and methods for the evaluation of NMR parameters"
2004	Tom Ziegler	"For outstanding applications of density functional theory, especially to organometallic chemistry"
2005	Michele Parrinello	"For the unification of molecular dynamics with density functional theory"
2006	Donald Truhlar	"For his outstanding contributions to the theory and computation of chemical reaction dynamics in ground and excited states"
2007	Sason Shaik	"For his outstanding contributions to the understanding of the chemical bond, reaction mechanisms in organic chemistry, and enzymatic reactivity"
2008	Rodney J. Bartlett	"For his outstanding work on the systematic development of correlated wave function methods, especially many-body perturbation theory and coupled cluster theory"
2009	Gernot Frenking	"For his outstanding work on computational organometallic chemistry and his fundamental contributions to the understanding of the chemical bond"
2010	Evert Jan Baerends	"For his pioneering contributions to the development of computational density functional methods and his fundamental contributions to density functional theory and density matrix theory"
2011	Peter Gill	"For his outstanding contributions to intracules, Coulomb operator resolutions, perturbative techniques, and two-electron systems"
2012	Pekka Pyykkö	"For his pioneering contributions to relativistic quantum chemistry"
2013	Stefan Grimme	"For his outstanding work on ab initio and density functional methods for large molecules"
2014	Mark Gordon	"For his contributions to the development and implementation of ab initio electronic structure methods and their application to complex systems"
2015	Helmut Schwarz	"For the successful combination of seminal experimental and computational research on mass spectrometry and catalysis"
2016	Hiroshi Nakatsuji	"For the discovery and development of general methods of solving the Schrödinger equation of atoms and molecules"
2017	Pavel Hobza	"For his outstanding work on noncovalent interactions"
2018	Klaus Ruedenberg	"For advancing ab initio quantum chemistry through seminal innovations, pioneering the deduction of bonding concepts from rigorous wave mechanical analyses and, notably, identifying the fundamental physical origin of covalent bonding"
2019	Joachim Sauer	"For his outstanding contributions to the quantum chemistry of solid materials and their successful application to heterogeneous catalysis"
2020	Martin Head-Gordon	"For his contributions to density functional theory, wave function methods, and energy decomposition analysis."
2021	Yitzhak Apeloig	"For his pioneering combined computational-experimental seminal contributions to silicon chemistry and mechanisms in organic chemistry"
2022	Frank Neese	"For his pioneering development of new quantum chemical methods for theoretical spectroscopy and local electron correlation, and their applications to real-life chemical problems"
2023	Jan Martin	"For ground-breaking contributions to the theory and practice of high-accuracy computational thermochemistry, and of double-hybrid density functional theory as a more economical alternative"
2024	Gustavo Scuseria	"For his outstanding contributions to coupled cluster, density functional, and symmetry projection theories, and the modeling of carbon nanostructures"
2025	Peter Schreiner	

== See also ==
- Erwin Schrödinger Prize
