= Mark S. Gordon =

American chemist and academic

- Born: January 18, 1942 (age 84); New York City
- Education: Rensselaer Polytechnic Institute; Carnegie Mellon University
- Known for: Computational methods in quantum chemistry
- Scientific career
- Fields: Theoretical chemistry Quantum chemistry Computational chemistry
- Workplaces: Iowa State University
- Doctoral advisor: John Pople

Mark S. Gordon is a professor of chemistry at Iowa State University, and Ames Laboratory working in the area of computational quantum chemistry. He is a member of The International Academy of Quantum Molecular Science.

Mark Gordon received his B.S. from Rensselaer Polytechnic Institute, followed by a PhD. from Carnegie Mellon working under the supervision of John Pople, followed by a postdoctoral stint with Klaus Ruedenberg at Iowa State University. He was on the faculty at North Dakota State University until 1993 when he moved to Iowa State University.

He is well known for his work with the GAMESS (US) quantum chemistry program.
