= International Academy of Quantum Molecular Science =

Organization devoted to applying quantum physics to chemistry

The International Academy of Quantum Molecular Science (IAQMS) is an international scientific learned society covering all applications of quantum theory to chemistry and chemical physics. It was created in Menton in 1967. The founding members were Raymond Daudel, Per-Olov Löwdin, Robert G. Parr, John Pople and Bernard Pullman. Its foundation was supported by Louis de Broglie.

Originally, the academy had 25 regular members under 65 years of age. This was later raised to 30, and then to 35. There is no limit on the number of members over 65 years of age. The members are "chosen among the scientists of all countries who have distinguished themselves by the value of their scientific work, their role of pioneer or leader of a school in the broad field of quantum chemistry, i.e. the application of quantum mechanics to the study of molecules and macromolecules". As of 2006, the academy consisted of 90 members. The academy organizes the International Congress of Quantum Chemistry every three years.

The academy awards a medal to a young member of the scientific community who has distinguished themselves by a pioneering and important contribution. The award has been made every year since 1967.

== Presidents ==
Presidents and vice-presidents of the academy since its inception:

Year	President	Vice-president
1967–1970; 1970–1973	Raymond Daudel	Per-Olov Löwdin
1973–1976; 1976–1979	Bernard Pullman	Robert Parr
1979–1982; 1982–1985	Per-Olov Löwdin	Alberte Pullman
1985–1988; 1988–1991	Alberte Pullman	John Pople
1991–1994; 1994–1997	Robert Parr	Keiji Morokuma
1997–2000	John Pople	Sigrid D. Peyerimhoff
2000-2003	Keiji Morokuma	Sigrid D. Peyerimhoff
2003-2006	Keiji Morokuma	Pekka Pyykkö
2006-2009	Sigrid D. Peyerimhoff	Pekka Pyykkö
2009-2012	Pekka Pyykkö	Josef Michl
2012-2015; 2015-2018	Josef Michl	Gustavo Scuseria
2018-2021; 2021-2023	Odile Eisenstein	Zhigang Shuai
2023-2026	Gustavo Scuseria	Joachim Sauer
2026-2029	Peter Gill	Trond Saue

== Members ==
- Ludwik Adamowicz
- Ali Alavi
- Millard H. Alexander
- Jean-Marie André
- Evert-Jan Baerends
- Vincenzo Barone
- Rodney J. Bartlett
- Mikhail V. Basilevsky
- Axel D. Becke
- Joel M. Bowman
- Jean-Luc Brédas
- Ria Broer-Braam
- A. David Buckingham
- Kieron Burke
- Petr Cársky
- Emily A. Carter
- Lorenz S. Cederbaum
- David M. Ceperley
- Garnet Kin-Lic Chan
- Jiří Čížek
- David Clary
- Enrico Clementi
- Ernest R. Davidson
- Wolfgang Domcke
- Thom Dunning Jr.
- Michel Dupuis
- Odile Eisenstein
- Jiali Gao
- Jürgen Gauß
- Peter Gill
- William A. Goddard, III
- Leticia González
- Mark S. Gordon
- Stefan Grimme
- George G. Hall
- Sharon Hammes-Schiffer
- Martin Head-Gordon
- Trygve Helgaker
- Eric J. Heller
- Kimihiko Hirao
- So Hirata
- Roald Hoffmann
- Kendall N. Houk
- Bogumil Jeziorski
- Poul Jørgensen
- William L. Jorgensen
- Joshua Jortner
- Martin Karplus
- Kwang S. Kim
- Wim Klopper
- Peter Knowles
- Ronnie Kosloff
- Georg Kresse
- Anna Krylov
- Werner Kutzelnigg
- Roland Lefebvre
- William A. Lester
- Raphael D. Levine
- Mel Levy
- Shuhua Li
- Jan Erik Linderberg
- Wenjian Liu
- Jean-Claude Lorquet
- Nancy Makri
- Jean-Paul Malrieu
- David E. Manolopoulos
- Rudolph A. Marcus
- Todd J. Martinez
- Roy McWeeny
- Benedetta Mennucci
- Wilfried E. Meyer
- Josef Michl
- William H. Miller
- Debashis Mukherjee
- Saburo Nagakura
- Shigeru Nagase
- Hiroshi Nakatsuji
- Frank Neese
- Willem C. Nieuwpoort
- Evgueni E. Nikitin
- Jozef Noga
- Marcel Nooijen
- Christian Ochsenfeld
- Jeppe Olsen
- Josef Paldus
- Michele Parrinello
- Ruben Pauncz (he:ראובן פאונץ)
- John P. Perdew
- Sigrid D. Peyerimhoff
- Piotr Piecuch
- Peter Pulay
- Pekka Pyykkö
- Leo Radom
- Krishnan Raghavachari
- Mark A. Ratner
- Julia Rice
- Michael A. Robb
- Clemens C. J. Roothaan
- Ursula Röthlisberger
- Klaus Ruedenberg
- Lionel Salem
- Trond Saue
- Andreas Savin
- Henry F. Schaefer, III
- George C. Schatz
- H. Bernhard Schlegel
- Peter Schwerdtfeger
- Gustavo E. Scuseria
- Sason Shaik
- Zhigang Shuai
- Per E. M. Siegbahn
- John F. Stanton
- Péter Szalay
- Krzysztof Szalewicz
- Seiichiro Ten-no
- Walter Thiel
- Jacopo Tomasi
- Donald G. Truhlar
- John Tully
- Miroslav Urban
- Ad van der Avoird
- Alain Veillard
- Luuk Visscher
- Gregory Voth
- Arieh Warshel
- Hans-Joachim Werner
- Weitao Yang
- Rudolf Zahradnik

=== Deceased members ===
- Reinhart Ahlrichs
- David R. Bates
- S. Francis Boys
- Louis de Broglie
- Charles A. Coulson
- David P. Craig
- Alexander Dalgarno
- Raymond Daudel
- Alexander S. Davydov
- Michael J. S. Dewar
- Henry Eyring
- Inga Fischer-Hjalmars
- Vladimir Aleksandrovich Fock
- Kenichi Fukui
- Rezsö Gaspar
- Nicholas C. Handy
- Hermann Hartmann
- Edgar Heilbronner
- Walter Heitler
- Gerhard Herzberg
- Joseph O. Hirschfelder
- Erich Hückel
- Friedrich Hund
- Michael Kasha
- Shigeki Kato
- Walter Kohn
- Wlodzimierz Kolos
- Masao Kotani
- Jaroslav Koutecky
- John C. Light
- William N. Lipscomb
- H. Christopher Longuet-Higgins
- Per-Olov Löwdin
- Frederick A. Matsen
- Harden M. McConnell
- Keiji Morokuma
- Robert S. Mulliken
- Robert G. Parr
- Linus Pauling
- John Pople
- Alberte Pullman
- Bernard Pullman
- Björn Olof Roos
- Camille Sandorfy
- Paul von Rague Schleyer
- Eolo Scrocco
- Isaiah Shavitt
- Massimo Simonetta
- John C. Slater
- Au-chin Tang
- Edward Teller
- John H. Van Vleck
- E. Bright Wilson
- Tom Ziegler
