= Reinhart Ahlrichs =

German theoretical chemist (1940–2016)

- Born: January 16, 1940; Göttingen
- Died: October 12, 2019 (aged 79)

Reinhart Ahlrichs (16 January 1940 – 12 October 2016) was a German theoretical chemist.

== Biography ==
Ahlrichs was born on the 16 January 1940 in Göttingen. He studied physics at the University of Göttingen (Diplom (M.Sc.) in 1965) and received his PhD in 1968 with W. A. Bingel. From 1968 to 1969 he was assistant at Göttingen with Werner Kutzelnigg and from 1969 to 1970 Postdoctoral Fellow with C. C. J. Roothaan at the University of Chicago.

After a period as assistant from 1970 to 1975 in Karlsruhe he had been Professor of Theoretical chemistry at the University of Karlsruhe. He also headed a research group at the INT.

His group developed the program TURBOMOLE.

== Awards ==
- Liebig-Denkmuenze (2000) from the German Chemical Society (GDCh)
- Bunsen-Denkmuenze (2000) from Deutsche Bunsengesellschaft

== Memberships ==
- International Academy of Quantum Molecular Science (since 1992)
- Heidelberger Akademie der Wissenschaften (since 1991)
