= Rodney J. Bartlett =

American chemist

Dr. Rodney Bartlett
- Born: March 31, 1944 (age 82)
- Education: University of Florida; Millsaps College
- Known for: Graduate Research Professor of Chemistry at UF
- Awards: Guggenheim Fellow; E.T.S. Walton Fellow; Received the American Chemical Society Award in Theoretical Chemistry
- Scientific career
- Fields: Chemistry
- Workplaces: University of Florida

Rodney Joseph Bartlett (born March 31, 1944, in Memphis, Tennessee, U.S.) is Graduate Research Professor of Chemistry and Physics, University of Florida, Gainesville, US.

== Career ==
He received his B.Sc. degree from Millsaps College in 1966 and Ph.D. from the University of Florida in 1971. Bartlett was an NDEA and IBM predoctoral fellow at the University of Florida under the joint supervision of N. Yngve Öhrn and Per-Olov Löwdin. Bartlett was subsequently an NSF postdoctoral researcher at Aarhus University, Denmark with Jan Linderberg and a postdoctoral researcher at Johns Hopkins University with Robert G. Parr. Bartlett became a staff scientist at Battelle's Pacific Northwest National Laboratory and then at Battelle Memorial Institute, Ohio. In 1981, Bartlett returned to Gainesville, as a professor of Chemistry and Physics, and then in 1988 rose to the rank of Graduate Research Professor.

Bartlett has been widely recognized as a pioneer of rigorous many-body methods for electron correlation, in particular, many-body perturbation and coupled cluster methods, which are today's central computational tool for accurate electronic structure predictions. Bartlett and his coworkers were the first to formulate and implement coupled cluster theory with all single and double excitation operators (CCSD) in 1982, followed by triple (CCSDT) in 1987, quadruple (CCSDTQ), and even quintuple (CCSDTQP) excitation operators, and also many-body perturbation methods up to the sixth order. He developed a version of Feynman diagrams that both expedited the derivation of the equations and helped to visualize the physics of electron correlation. He also promoted the concept of size extensivity for many-body theory that scales properly with the number of particles, now viewed as an essential element of sound quantum chemistry approximations. Bartlett was also the first to explore the combination of coupled-cluster and many-body perturbation theories (in 1985) and proposed vastly successful approximations.

It is now widely agreed that the coupled cluster and many-body perturbation methods that Bartlett has been instrumental in establishing offer the most predictive, generally applicable approaches in the field. These methods helped electronic structure theory be accepted by the chemistry community as a reliable and integral branch of chemistry. Bartlett has been among the most frequently cited chemists and ranked 25th in the period of 1981–97 according to ISI.

== Honors and awards ==
Bartlett was a Guggenheim Fellow at Harvard University and University of California, Berkeley in 1986, E.T.S. Walton Fellow of the Science Foundation of Ireland, a member of the International Academy of Quantum Molecular Science, and a recipient of Florida 2000 Award from the Florida Section of the American Chemical Society. Bartlett is the recipient of the American Chemical Society Award in Theoretical Chemistry (2007), the 2008 Schrödinger Medal of World Association of Theoretical and Computational Chemists (WATOC), the Boys-Rahman Award of the Royal Society of Chemistry (2009), Southern Chemist Award (2010), and honorary doctorates from Millsaps College (his alma mater) and from Comenius University (2012) in Bratislava, Slovakia.

He was elected a Fellow of the American Physical Society in 1989 for "the development of many-electron methods for electron correlation in molecules, principally many-body perturbation theory and coupled-cluster theory, and their applications in chemical physics".
