= William Hughes Miller =

American theoretical chemist

William Miller
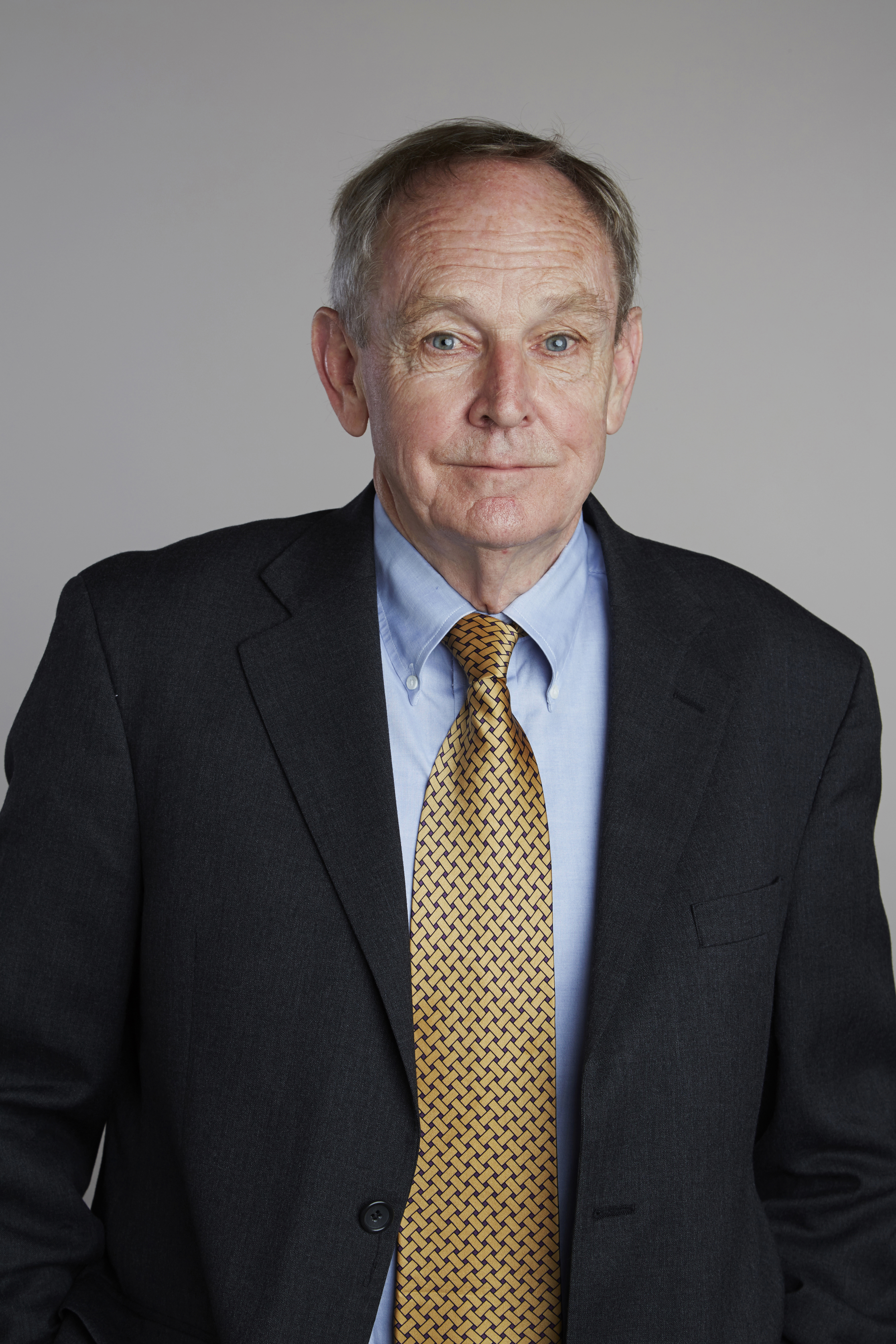
- William Miller in 2015, portrait via the Royal Society
- Born: William Hughes Miller; March 16, 1941 (age 85); Kosciusko, Mississippi, U.S.
- Education: Georgia Institute of Technology (B.S., 1963); Harvard University (Ph.D., 1967)
- Known for: Semiclassical methods in chemical dynamics
- Spouse: Margaret Ann Westbrook
- Awards: Annual Prize of the International Academy of Quantum Molecular Science (1974); Ernest O. Lawrence Award (1985); Irving Langmuir Award (1990); ACS Award in Theoretical Chemistry (1994); Hirschfelder Prize (1996); Ira Remsen Award (1997); Spiers Memorial Prize (1998); Peter Debye Award (2003); Welch Award in Chemistry (2007); Ahmed Zewail Prize in Molecular Sciences (2011); Member of the National Academy of Sciences (1987); ForMemRS (2015)
- Scientific career
- Fields: Theoretical chemistry, chemical dynamics
- Institutions: University of California, Berkeley
- Doctoral advisor: Edgar Bright Wilson
- Doctoral students: Barbara J. Garrison; Rigoberto Hernandez; Nancy Makri; Ann Orel; Richard Stratt; Sean Sun
- Other notable students: Post-docs: Thomas F. George; Daniel Lidar; Neepa Maitra; Martin Quack; Tamar Seideman; Gregory A. Voth; Weitao Yang
- Website: www.cchem.berkeley.edu/millergrp

William Hughes Miller (born March 16, 1941, Kosciusko, Mississippi) is an American theoretical chemist and professor emeritus at the University of California, Berkeley. He is known for his development of semiclassical methods for treating chemical dynamics, and his contributions have been described as having "essentially defined the field of theoretical chemical dynamics."

== Early life and education ==
Miller was born in Kosciusko, Mississippi, and grew up in Jackson. He received a Bachelor of Science in chemistry from the Georgia Institute of Technology in 1963. He then entered Harvard University for graduate studies in chemical physics, working under the supervision of Edgar Bright Wilson. He received his Ph.D. in 1967.

== Career ==
From 1967 to 1969, Miller was a Junior Fellow in Harvard's Society of Fellows, during which he also spent a year as a NATO postdoctoral fellow at the Physikalisches Institut of the University of Freiburg in Germany. He joined the chemistry department at the University of California, Berkeley, as an assistant professor in 1969 and became a full professor in 1974. He served as department chairman from 1989 to 1993, and in 1999 was named the Kenneth S. Pitzer Distinguished Professor of Chemistry.

== Research ==
Miller's research has addressed a broad range of topics in molecular collision theory and chemical reaction dynamics. His major contributions include the development of a comprehensive semiclassical (classical S-matrix) theory of atomic and molecular collisions, which revealed the physical origins of quantum effects such as interference, tunnelling, and "rainbows" in product state distributions. Within this framework, the first example of chaotic scattering was identified and analysed.

He developed a widely used formulation of quantum mechanical reactive scattering theory for chemical reactions, including the S-matrix version of the Kohn variational principle. Other major contributions include a theory of electronically non-adiabatic processes and a semiclassical "instanton" theory of deep quantum tunnelling.

For more complex molecular systems, Miller's group pursued the use of the semiclassical initial value representation (SC-IVR) as a way to incorporate quantum effects—such as interference, tunnelling, zero-point energy, and identical particle symmetry—into classical molecular dynamics simulations.

== Awards and honours ==
Miller has received numerous awards, including the Annual Prize of the International Academy of Quantum Molecular Science (1974), the Ernest O. Lawrence Award (1985), the Irving Langmuir Award in Chemical Physics (1990), the ACS Award in Theoretical Chemistry (1994), the Hirschfelder Prize in Theoretical Chemistry (1996), the Ira Remsen Award (1997), the Spiers Medal of the Royal Society of Chemistry (1998), the Peter Debye Award in Physical Chemistry (2003), the Welch Award in Chemistry (2007), the Herschbach Award in Molecular Dynamics (2007), and the Ahmed Zewail Prize in Molecular Sciences (2011).

Earlier in his career, he held an Alfred P. Sloan Research Fellowship (1970–1972) and was a Camille and Henry Dreyfus Teacher-Scholar (1973–1979). He was also an Overseas Fellow of Churchill College, Cambridge (1975–1976), a recipient of the Alexander von Humboldt Senior Scientist Award (1981–1982), and a Christensen Fellow of St Catharine's College, Oxford (1993).

Miller was elected to the National Academy of Sciences in 1987 and became a Fellow of the American Academy of Arts and Sciences in 1993. In 2011, he was elected to the German Academy of Sciences Leopoldina. He is also a member of the International Academy of Quantum Molecular Science.

Miller was elected a Foreign Member of the Royal Society (ForMemRS) in 2015. His nomination reads:

Professor Miller's papers over the last 45 years have essentially defined the field of theoretical chemical dynamics. His seminal contributions include a comprehensive semi-classical theory of atomic and molecular collisions, an elegant theory of electronically non-adiabatic processes in which the nuclear and electronic motions are treated on an equal footing, a highly accurate semi-classical "instanton" theory of deep quantum tunnelling events, and the definitive exact quantum mechanical theory of chemical reaction rates. These fundamental developments are at the root of the agreement between theory and experiment that we are now accustomed to seeing in chemical reaction dynamics, and the basis of essentially all modern theoretical research in the area.
