= Ad van der Avoird =

Dutch theoretical chemist

Ad van der Avoird (born 19 April 1943) is a Dutch theoretical chemist. He was professor of theoretical chemistry at the Radboud University Nijmegen.

== Education and career ==
Van der Avoird was born on 19 April 1943 in Eindhoven. He studied at Eindhoven University of Technology, obtaining his PhD under George Schuit in 1968 with a thesis titled: "Perturbation theory for intermolecular forces : application to some adsorption models". He was professor of theoretical chemistry at the Radboud University Nijmegen and took up emeritus status in 2008 although he kept working. In 2013 Van der Avoird provided a theory on the relation between two benzene rings and their possible motion, the discovery was published with Gerard Meijer and a German research team in a paper in Angewandte Chemie. The model solved a decade old scientific issue.

== Honors and awards ==
On 25 April 2014 he was made a Knight in the Order of the Netherlands Lion, one of only fifteen appointees that year. Amongst other accomplishments he was given the honor for his model of benzene dimer.

Van der Avoird became member of the Royal Netherlands Academy of Arts and Sciences in 1979. He is also member of the International Academy of Quantum Molecular Science.
