= Molecular Physics (journal) =

- Discipline: Physical chemistry
- Language: English

Publication details
- History: 1958-present
- Publisher: Taylor & Francis
- Frequency: Biweekly
- Impact factor: 1.937 (2021)

Standard abbreviations
- ISO 4: Mol. Phys.

Indexing
- CODEN: MOPHAM
- ISSN: 0026-8976 (print); 1362-3028 (web)
- LCCN: 59016795
- OCLC no.: 49725826

Links
- Journal homepage; Online access; Online archive

Molecular Physics is a peer-reviewed scientific journal covering research on the interface between chemistry and physics, in particular chemical physics and physical chemistry. It covers both theoretical and experimental molecular science, including electronic structure, molecular dynamics, spectroscopy, reaction kinetics, statistical mechanics, condensed matter and surface science. The journal was established in 1958 and is published by Taylor & Francis. According to the Journal Citation Reports, the journal has a 2021 impact factor of 1.937.

The current editor-in-chief is Professor George Jackson (Imperial College London). A reprint of the first editorial and a full list of editors since its establishment can be found in the issue celebrating 50 years of the journal.

== Notable current and former editors ==
- Christopher Longuet-Higgins (Founding Editor)
- Joan van der Waals (Founding Editor)
- John Shipley Rowlinson
- A. David Buckingham
- Lawrence D. Barron
- Martin Quack
- Dominic Tildesley
- Henry F. Schaefer III
- Nicholas C. Handy
- Ruth Lynden-Bell
- Jean-Pierre Hansen
- Timothy Softley
- Martin Head-Gordon
- Trygve Helgaker

== See also ==
- List of scientific journals in physics
- List of scientific journals in chemistry
