= Katarzyna Pernal =

Polish chemist and professor

- Occupation: Academic teacher
- Title: Professor of Physical Sciences
- Awards: Medal of the International Academy of Quantum Molecular Science (IAQMS)

Academic background
- Education: Florida State University (PhD, 2002) Nicolaus Copernicus University in Toruń (Habilitation, 2007, Physical Sciences) Professorship: 2017

Academic work
- Discipline: quantum chemistry and computational chemistry
- Institutions: Łódź University of Technology

Katarzyna Pernal is a Polish theoretical and computational chemist and a professor at Łódź University of Technology. She leads the Quantum Chemistry Research Group at the Institute of Physics of Łódź University of Technology. Her research focuses on the development of quantum and computational chemistry methods, particularly those employing reduced electron density matrices.

== Education ==
She graduated from the Faculty of Chemistry at Łódź University of Technology. In 2002, she earned her PhD from Florida State University in the United States and Faculty of Chemistry at Nicolaus Copernicus University in Toruń. Following her doctoral studies, she completed postdoctoral fellowships at Vrije Universiteit Amsterdam (2005–2007), the Max Planck Institute for the Physics of Complex Systems in Dresden (2002 and 2003), and the University of Delaware in the United States (2008). In 2007, she obtained a habilitation degree in physical sciences, and in 2017 she was awarded the title of Professor of Physical Sciences.

== Career ==
Since 2008, she has headed the Quantum Chemistry Research Group at the Institute of Physics of Łódź University of Technology. Her research interests include quantum chemistry and computational chemistry, with a particular emphasis on developing methods for describing the electronic structure of molecules. Her work focuses especially on approaches based on reduced electron density matrices and density functional theory (DFT).

She serves on the editorial board of Physical Review Letters, published by the American Physical Society. Between 2021 and 2023, she was a Topic Editor of The Journal of Physical Chemistry Letters, published by the American Chemical Society. She is also a member of the editorial boards of Journal of Chemical Theory and Computation (ACS), Molecular Physics (Taylor & Francis), and International Journal of Quantum Chemistry (Wiley).

== Awards and honors ==
- 2015 – Awarded the Medal of the International Academy of Quantum Molecular Science (IAQMS).
- 2018 – Recipient of The Harry Kroto Lectureship in Chemical Physics at Florida State University.
- 2025'– Elected Corresponding Member of the Polish Academy of Sciences.
