= Julia Rice =

British-American computational chemist

Julia Elizabeth Rice (born 10 July 1960) is a British-American computational chemist who works for IBM Research at their Almaden Research Center in San Jose California. Her work their involves the study of nonlinear optics in the simulation of organic molecules, the development of the Mulliken software package for quantum chemistry, the management of scientific data, and connections to statistical mechanics.

== Education and career ==
Rice was born on 10 July 1960 in Cambridge, England. She earned a bachelor's degree in mathematics and chemistry from Royal Holloway, University of London in 1981, winning the Martin Holloway Prize as that year's best honours finalist in her subject. She completed her Ph.D. in theoretical chemistry at the University of Cambridge in 1985, under the supervision of Nicholas C. Handy.

After postdoctoral research with Henry F. Schaefer III at the University of California, Berkeley, and a year as a research fellow of Newnham College, Cambridge, she joined IBM Research in 1988.

== Recognition ==
In 2001, Rice was named a Fellow of the American Physical Society (APS), after a nomination from the APS Division of Computational Physics, "for pioneering the development of efficient algorithms for the analytic derivative method with electron correlation, and for the calculation of frequency dependent polarizabilities with accuracy comparable to experiment". She was elected to the IBM Academy of Technology in 2003, and is a member of the International Academy of Quantum Molecular Science.
