= Walter Thiel (chemist) =

German chemist (1949–2019)

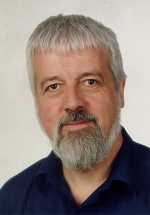
- Born: March 7, 1949; Treysa, Hesse, Germany
- Died: August 23, 2019 (aged 70)
- Education: University of Marburg
- Known for: Semi-empirical quantum chemistry methods MNDO
- Awards: Schrödinger Medal (2002); Liebig Medal (2012)
- Scientific career
- Fields: Theoretical chemistry
- Workplaces: University of Zurich; Max Planck Institute for Coal Research
- Thesis: (1973)
- Doctoral advisor: Armin Schweig
- Other academic advisors: Michael J. S. Dewar

Walter Thiel (7 March 1949 in Treysa, Hesse – 23 August 2019) was a German theoretical chemist. He was the president of the World Association of Theoretical and Computational Chemists (WATOC) from 2011.

== Academic career ==
Thiel studied chemistry at the University of Marburg (West Germany) from 1966 to 1971, where he subsequently obtained his doctorate with Armin Schweig in 1973. After a post-doctoral stint at the University of Texas at Austin with M. J. S. Dewar (1973–1975), he obtained his habilitation from the University of Marburg in 1981. He was appointed Professor of Theoretical Chemistry at the University of Wuppertal (West Germany) in 1983 and Professor of Chemistry at the University of Zurich (Switzerland) in 1992. In 1987 he was a visiting professor at the University of California at Berkeley. Since 1999, he was a director at the Max Planck Institute for Coal Research in Mülheim an der Ruhr (Germany) and an honorary professor at the neighboring University of Düsseldorf (Germany) since 2001.

== Fellowships and awards ==
- 1975 Liebig Fellowship of the Fonds der Chemischen Industrie
- 1982 Heisenberg Fellowship of the Deutsche Forschungsgemeinschaft
- 1988 Award of the Alfried Krupp von Bohlen und Halbach Foundation
- 2002 Schrödinger medal of the World Association of Theoretically Oriented Chemists (WATOC)
- 2007 Member of the Deutsche Akademie der Naturforscher Leopoldina
- 2007 Member of the International Academy of Quantum Molecular Science

== Research ==
Thiel's research interests included the broad areas of theoretical chemistry, in particular quantum chemistry, and computational chemistry, with a focus on large molecules, spectroscopy, and catalysis. His group was involved in the development of new theoretical methods, in particular for the treatment of large molecules, and applied theoretical calculations to concrete chemical problems, usually in close collaboration with experimentalists.

Selected methodological contributions

- Development and implementation of semi-empirical quantum-chemical methods: Development of MNDO-type approaches (orthogonalization-corrected OMx methods, MNDO/d for transition metals); computation of NMR-chemical shifts; semi-empirical multireference configuration interaction (MRCI) methods. Semi-empirical method developments are implemented in the MNDO program.
- Development of combined quantum mechanics/molecular mechanics (QM/MM) methods: Coupling approaches, boundary method, QM/MM structure optimization. Developments in this area are implemented within the ChemShell package.

Selected application areas

- Highly accurate correlated QM calculations for smaller molecules; theoretical rovibrational spectroscopy.
- Transition-metal chemistry, homogeneous catalysis (typically applying density-functional theory methods).
- Mechanisms of enzymatic reactions (using QM/MM methods).
