= Gregory A. Voth =

American chemist (born 1959)

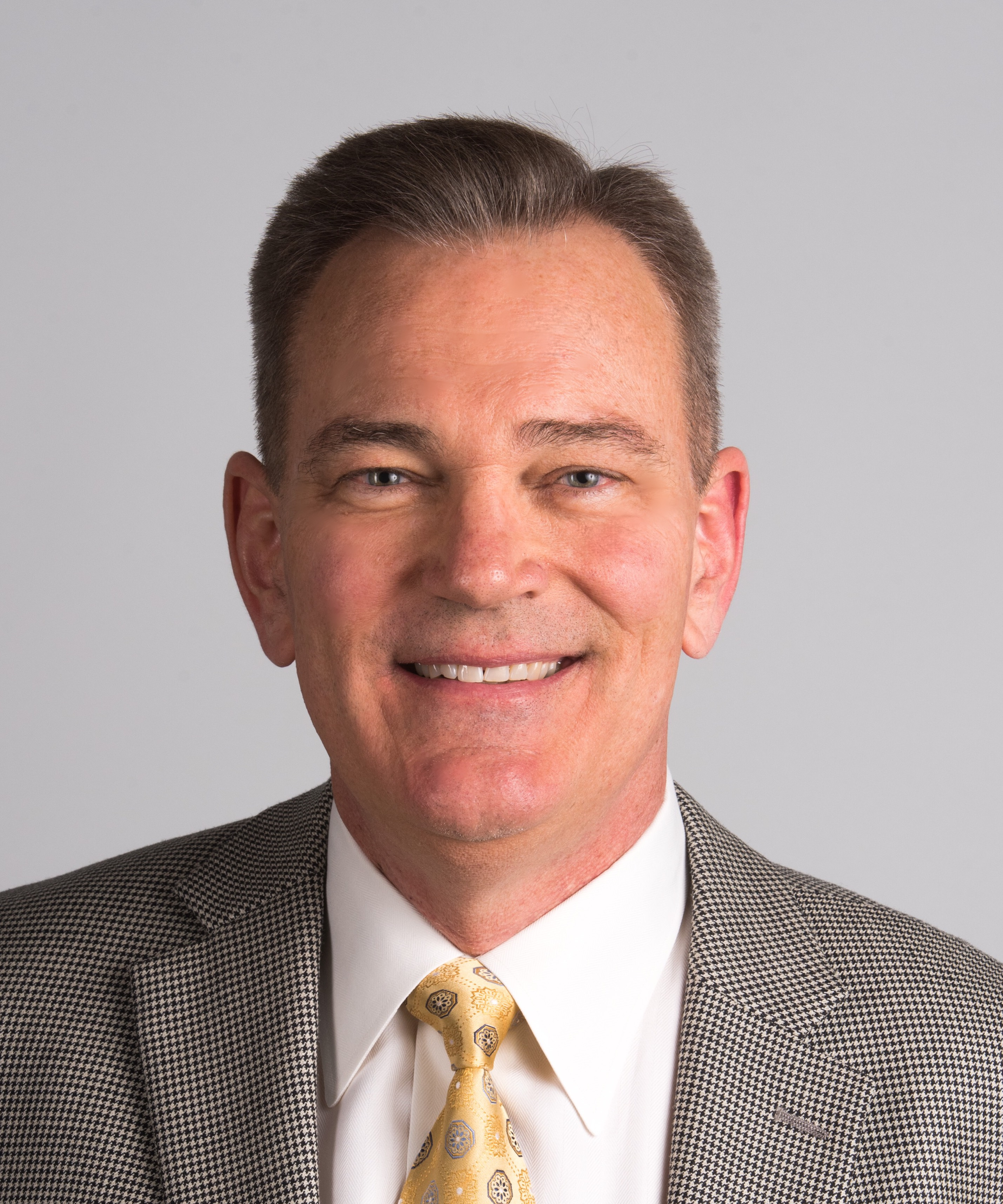
- Haig P. Papazian Distinguished Service Professor of Chemistry
- Born: January 22, 1959 (age 67); Topeka, Kansas, United States
- Education: California Institute of Technology; University of Kansas
- Awards: National Award in Theoretical Chemistry, American Chemical Society, 2025, Biophysical Society Innovation Award 2021, ACS J. H. Hildebrand Award in 2019 in the Theoretical and Experimental Chemistry of Liquids, S F Boys-A Rahman Award Winner, 2019, ACS Division of Physical Chemistry Award in Theoretical Chemistry, 2013
- Scientific career
- Fields: Theoretical chemistry, biophysics, physical chemistry, materials science
- Workplaces: University of Chicago
- Thesis: Theoretical studies of intramolecular dynamics and energy redistribution (1987)
- Doctoral advisor: Rudolph A. Marcus
- Website: https://voices.uchicago.edu/vothgroup/

Gregory A. Voth (born January 22, 1959) is a theoretical chemist and Haig P. Papazian Distinguished Service Professor of Chemistry at the University of Chicago. He is also a professor of the James Franck Institute and the Institute for Biophysical Dynamics.

== Education ==
He received his bachelor's degree from University of Kansas in 1981 with highest distinction and honors and a Ph.D. in theoretical chemistry from the California Institute of Technology in 1987. His doctoral advisor was Rudolph A. Marcus. He was also an IBM Postdoctoral Fellow at the University of California, Berkeley from 1987-1989. At Berkeley, his postdoctoral advisors were William Hughes Miller and David Chandler.

== Career ==
Professor Voth is interested in the development and application of theoretical and computational methods to study problems involving the structure and dynamics of complex condensed phase systems, including proteins, membranes, liquids, and materials. He has developed a method known as “multiscale coarse-graining” in which the resolution of the molecular-scale entities is reduced into simpler structures, but key information on their interactions is accurately retained (or renormalized) so the resulting computer simulation can accurately and efficiently predict the properties of large assemblies of complex molecules such as lipids and proteins. This method is multiscale, meaning it describes complex condensed phase and biomolecular systems from the molecular scale to the mesoscale and ultimately to the macroscopic scale. Professor Voth’s other research interests include the study of charge transport (protons and electrons) in aqueous systems and biomolecules – a fundamental process in living organisms and other systems that have been poorly understood because of its complexity. He also studies the exotic behavior of room-temperature ionic liquids and other complex materials such nanoparticle self-assembly, polymer electrolyte membranes, and electrode-electrolyte interfaces in energy storage devices. In the earlier part of his career, Professor Voth extensively developed and applied new methods to study quantum and electron transfer dynamics in condensed phase systems-much of this work was based on the Feynman path integral description of quantum mechanics.

As of 07/11/2025, Prof. Gregory A. Voth is the author or co-author of more than 650 peer-reviewed scientific articles (Google Scholar h-index = 129; total citations = 67,893) and has mentored more than 200 postdoctoral fellows and graduate students.

== Honors and awards ==
- Procter and Gamble Award for Outstanding Research in Physical Chemistry, ACS, 1985
- Herbert Newby McCoy Award, California Institute of Technology, 1986
- Francis and Milton Clauser Doctoral Prize, California Institute of Technology, 1987
- Camille and Henry Dreyfus Distinguished New Faculty Award, 1989
- David and Lucile Packard Foundation Fellowship in Science and Engineering, 1990–1995
- Presidential Young Investigator Award, 1991–1996
- Alfred P. Sloan Foundation Research Fellow, 1992–1994
- Camille Dreyfus Teacher-Scholar Award, 1994–1999
- IBM Corporation Faculty Research Award, 1997–1999, 2003–2005
- Fellow of the American Physical Society, 1997
- Fellow of the American Association for the Advancement of Science, 1999
- National Science Foundation Creativity Award, 1998–2002
- Miller Visiting Professorship, University of California, Berkeley, 2003
- Received John Simon Guggenheim Fellowship, 2004–2005
- University of Utah Distinguished Scholarly and Creative Research Award, 2008
- Fellow of the American Chemical Society, 2009
- Fellow of the Biophysical Society, 2012
- Elected to the International Academy of Quantum Molecular Science, 2013
- ACS Division of Physical Chemistry Award in Theoretical Chemistry, 2013
- Stanislaw M. Ulam Distinguished Scholar, Los Alamos National Laboratory, 2014
- ACS Joel Henry Hildebrand Award in the Theoretical and Experimental Chemistry of Liquids, 2019
- S F Boys-A Rahman Award Winner, 2019. Royal Society of Chemistry
- Biophysical Society Innovation Award, 2021. Biophysical Society
- Satish Dhawan Distinguished Visiting Professor, Indian Institute of Science, 2023
- National Award in Theoretical Chemistry, American Chemical Society, 2025
