= John Perdew =

American physicist

John P. Perdew
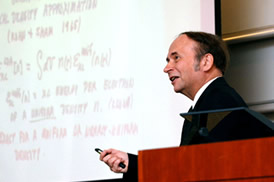
- John Perdew gives a talk at the Tulane University 2007 School of Science and Engineering (SSE) Research Day.
- Born: August 30, 1943 (age 83); Cumberland, Maryland, US
- Education: Cornell University (Ph.D., M.S.), Gettysburg College (A.B.)
- Awards: Elected to National Academy of Sciences
- Scientific career
- Fields: solid-state physics, density functional theory, quantum chemistry
- Workplaces: Temple University, Tulane University

John P. Perdew (born August 30, 1943) is a theoretical condensed matter physicist known for his contributions to the fields of solid-state physics and quantum chemistry. His work on density functional theory has led to him being one of the world's most cited physicists. Perdew currently teaches and conducts research at Tulane University.

== Early life and education ==
John Perdew was born and raised in Cumberland, Maryland. After showing an aptitude for mathematics in high school, Perdew received a National Merit Scholarship and attended Gettysburg College, where he developed his interest in physics.

Perdew graduated Summa cum laude from Gettysburg College with a Bachelor of Arts in physics in 1965. He then received a Ph.D. in physics from Cornell University in 1971. His doctoral advisor was John W. Wilkins, who introduced Perdew to solid-state theory.

== Academic career ==
Perdew began his academic career as a postdoctoral fellow under Sy Vosko at the University of Toronto from 1971 to 1974, and then with David Langreth at Rutgers University from 1975 to 1977.

Perdew started his teaching career in 1977 at Tulane University, where he taught until 2013. During his time at Tulane, Perdew taught physics and supervised nine completed Ph.D.'s as well as 11 postdoctoral fellows. He received the Outstanding Researcher Award from Tulane's School of Science and Engineering in 2007 and the President's Awards for Excellence in Professional and Graduate Teaching in 2009.

In 2013, Perdew moved to Temple University, where he is a Laura H. Carnell Professor of Physics and Chemistry at Temple's School of Science and Technology, as well as the founding director of the Center for Materials Theory. In 2023, Perdew returned to Tulane University as a Professor of Physics.

== Work in density functional theory ==
John Perdew's best-known scientific contributions are in the field of density functional theory (DFT). He was introduced to DFT by his postdoctoral supervisors at University of Toronto and Rutgers, before it became widely used.

Perdew was one of the early pioneers of density functional theory, helping it become accurate enough for calculations in quantum chemistry, materials science, and geoscience. He made important contributions to the exact adiabatic connection fluctuation dissipation theorem (ACFD) for the (exchange)-correlation energy, the derivative discontinuity and its contribution to the fundamental gap, scaling and other exact constraints on the functionals, the self-interaction correction, the nonempirical generalized gradient approximation (GGA), and the nonempirical meta-GGA. In 1984 he derived the Levy-Perdew-Sahni (LPS) equation, the analogue to the Kohn-Sham equations for Orbital-free density functional theory.

Visualizing DFT functionals to be a succession of ladder steps, Perdew formulated the Jacob's Ladder strategy for constructing improved density functionals for the exchange-correlation energy. Perdew first presented this theory at the International Congress of Quantum Chemistry's DFT2000 symposium in June 2000, describing five generations of functionals in a sequence he called the Jacob's Ladder. Perdew's Jacob's Ladder scheme has been picked up by other researchers in DFT and progress higher up the ladder continue to appear in the field's scientific literature.

Perdew continues DFT research in his role at Tulane University. His current research interests include the construction of a better meta-GGA and improved descriptions for strong correlation and for the van der Waals interaction.

== Impact on field ==
John Perdew is one of the world's most cited physicists, with over 410,000 Google Scholar citations referring to his work in the field of density functional theory. A study identifies him as possibly the world's most-cited physicist for articles published between 1981 and 2010. Of Perdew's more than 260 published works, a 1996 paper titled "Generalized Gradient Approximation Made Simple" from the journal Physical Review Letters has been cited more than 147,000 times and was the most-cited paper in the field of physics from 1996 to 2010. In total, Perdew has five works among the 10 most-cited physics papers of the past 30 years.

Many of Perdew's peers recognize his influence on the field of density functional theory. He was elected to the National Academy of Sciences (USA) in 2011. Upon naming Perdew as the recipient of the 2012 Materials Theory Award, the Materials Research Society cited Perdew's "pioneering contributions" that resulted in thousands of other researchers being able to perform DFT calculations and simulations.

== Honors and awards ==
John Perdew was elected to the National Academy of Sciences in 2011, and is one of 2,000 distinguished scientists from all fields that help advise the U.S. government on scientific policy. Other notable awards and honors include:

- 2003 Elected to the International Academy of Quantum Molecular Science
- 2007 Outstanding Researcher Award from Tulane's School of Science and Engineering
- 2009 April issue of Journal of Chemical Theory and Computation dedicated to Perdew in honor of his 65th birthday
- 2009 Tulane University President's Awards for Excellence in Professional and Graduate Teaching
- 2012 Received Materials Theory Award from the Materials Research Society
- 2015 Alexander von Humboldt Professorship
- 2015 Doctor Honoris Causa, Budapest University of Technology and Economics
- 2015 John Scott Medal
