= Henry F. Schaefer III =

American theoretical chemist

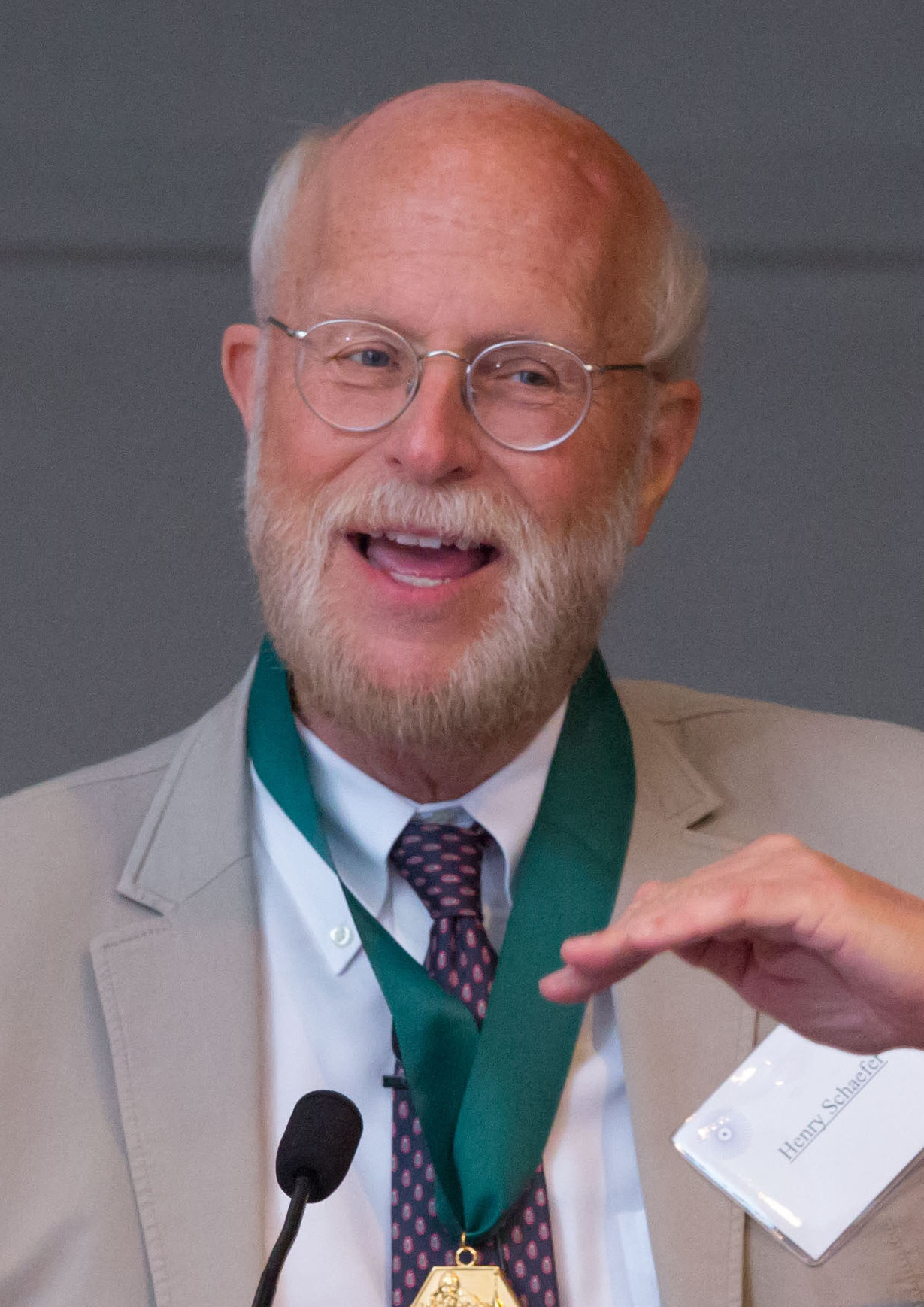
- Schaefer in 2019
- Born: Henry Frederick Schaefer III; June 8, 1944 (age 82); Grand Rapids, Michigan, U.S.
- Education: Massachusetts Institute of Technology (BS); Stanford University (PhD)
- Spouse: Karen Rasmussen (m. 1966)
- Awards: ACS Award in Pure Chemistry (1979); Schrödinger Medal (1990); Centenary Prize (1992); Ira Remsen Award (2003); Humboldt Prize (2012); Chemical Pioneer Award (2013); Peter Debye Award (2014); American Institute of Chemists Gold Medal (2019)
- Scientific career
- Fields: Computational chemistry Theoretical chemistry Physical chemistry
- Workplaces: University of California, Berkeley; University of Texas at Austin; University of Georgia
- Thesis: Configuration Interaction Wave Functions and the Properties of Atoms and Diatomic Molecules (1969)
- Doctoral students: Michael Colvin; Kwang Soo Kim; Charles Blahous

Henry Frederick "Fritz" Schaefer III (born June 8, 1944) is an American computational, physical, and theoretical chemist.

Schaefer is the Graham Perdue Professor of Chemistry at the University of Georgia, where he is also the director of its Center for Computational Chemistry. He was previously a professor at the University of California, Berkeley, and the Wilfred T. Doherty Professor of Chemistry at the University of Texas at Austin, where he had been the inaugural director of the Institute for Theoretical Chemistry. He is one of the most highly cited chemists in the world, with a Thomson Reuters h-index of 121 as of 2020.

Schaefer is a fellow of the American Academy of Arts and Sciences, the American Physical Society, the American Association for the Advancement of Science, the Royal Society of Chemistry, the American Chemical Society, and an honorary fellow of the Chemical Research Society of India. He is the author of more than 1,600 scientific papers and was nominated for the Nobel Prize on five occasions.

== Early life and education ==
Schaefer was born in Grand Rapids, Michigan, and was raised in Syracuse, New York; Menlo Park, California; and East Grand Rapids, Michigan. He was one of three children of Henry F. Schaefer Jr. and Janice Christine Trost, both graduates of the University of Michigan. As a high school student at local Rapids High School, Schaefer met his wife, Karen Rasmussen, and worked as a factory worker for a steel company.

After high school, Schaefer attended the Massachusetts Institute of Technology (MIT), where he initially intended to specialize in chemical engineering. After deciding to switch to chemical physics, he graduated from MIT with a Bachelor of Science (B.S.) in the subject in 1966. He had the opportunity to work with scientists George Whitesides, John C. Slater, F. Albert Cotton, and Richard C. Lord. Walter Thorson, Schaefer's academic advisor at MIT, recommended that he study quantum chemistry with Thorson's own guidance, under which Schaefer produced his senior thesis on the electronic structure of the compound cubane.

After graduating from MIT, Schaefer was awarded a fellowship from the National Defense Education Act Fellowship to study chemical physics at Stanford University and received his Ph.D. in 1969. At Stanford, he worked with chemist Frank E. Harris on ab initio electronic structure theory and quantum chemistry. For his Ph.D. thesis, he examined the electronic structure of first-row atoms and the oxygen molecule. He published 12 articles in journals including Physical Review and Physical Review Letters prior to defending his dissertation.

== Career ==
Schaefer became an assistant professor of chemistry at the University of California, Berkeley in 1969, with access to Berkeley's Control Data Corporation (CDC) 6600 mainframe computer. Through collaborations with other researchers, he also gained access to resources at the University Computing Company (UCC) in Palo Alto, which had a UNIVAC 1108. He worked at Berkeley from 1969 to 1987, with one exception. Schaefer spent 1979-1980 as the Wilfred T. Doherty Professor of Chemistry and inaugural Director of the Institute for Theoretical Chemistry at the University of Texas, Austin, before deciding to return to Berkeley. During his time at Berkeley, Schaefer published 375 papers and several books, including The Electronic Structure of Atoms and Molecules: A Survey of Rigorous Quantum Mechanical Results (1972) and Quantum Chemistry: The Development of Ab Initio Methods in Molecular Electronic Structure Theory (1984), a survey of research with commentary.

In August 1987, Schaefer moved to the University of Georgia as Graham Perdue Professor of Chemistry and director of the newly formed Center for Computational Chemistry. With the help of an IBM 3090-200E mainframe (as well as later models) he and his research group developed various computer-based methods for advanced quantum chemistry.

Other academic appointments include Professeur d'Echange at the University of Paris (1977), Gastprofessur at the Eidgenössische Technische Hochschule (ETH), Zurich (1994, 1995, 1997, 2000, 2002, 2004, 2006, 2008, 2010), and David P. Craig Visiting professor at the Australian National University (1999). In 2004, he became Professor of Chemistry Emeritus, at UC Berkeley.

Schaefer became a member of the International Academy of Quantum Molecular Science (IAQMS) in 1984. He was elected president of WATOC (World Association of Theoretical and Computational Chemists) in 1996, and held the position until 2005. He is also a Fellow of the American Physical Society as of 1977, of the American Association for the Advancement of Science as of 2002, and of the American Academy of Arts and Sciences as of 2004.

As of January 2020, Schaefer was the author of more than 1,600 peer-reviewed publications. A majority of these appeared in the Journal of Chemical Physics, the Journal of the American Chemical Society, and the Journal of Physical Chemistry. He was the editor of Molecular Physics for 11 years. He has directed 123 Ph.D. students, as well as many postdoctoral associates and visiting professors, now working at 42 academic institutions around the world.

In 2023, Schaefer was the eighth highest paid faculty member at the University of Georgia, with a salary of $430,140.

== Research ==
Research within the Schaefer group involves the use of computational hardware and theoretical methods to solve problems in molecular quantum mechanics. His contributions to the field of quantum chemistry include a paper challenging, on theoretical grounds, the geometry of triplet methylene as assigned by Nobel Prize-winning experimentalist Gerhard Herzberg; the development of the Z-vector method simplifying certain calculations of correlated systems; and a wide body of work undertaken in his research group on the geometries, properties, and reactions of chemical systems using highly accurate ab initio quantum chemical techniques. Many of these papers have predicted, or forced a reinterpretation of, experimental results.

=== Awards and honors ===
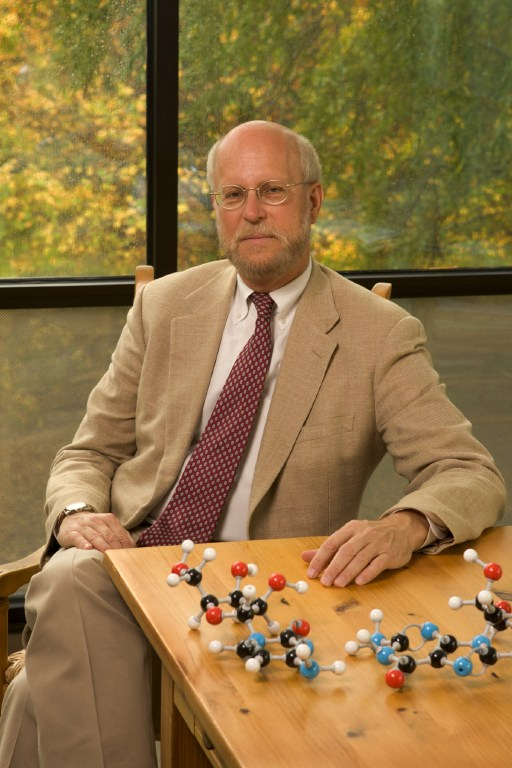
Schaefer in 2009

Schaefer was awarded the American Chemical Society's ACS Award in Pure Chemistry in 1979 "for the development of computational quantum chemistry into a reliable quantitative field of chemistry and for prolific exemplary calculations of broad chemical interest". The Pure Chemistry Award is given to the outstanding chemist in America under the age of 35. In 1983, he received the Leo Hendrik Baekeland award for the most distinguished North American chemist under the age of 40. In 1992, he was awarded the Centenary Prize of the Royal Society of Chemistry, London, for being "the first theoretical chemist successfully to challenge the accepted conclusion of a distinguished experimental group for a polyatomic molecule, namely methylene."

In 2003, Schaefer received the American Chemical Society Award in Theoretical Chemistry and the Ira Remsen Award of Johns Hopkins University. In 2004, a six-day conference was convened in Gyeongju, Korea on the “Theory and Applications of Computational Chemistry: A Celebration of 1000 Papers of Professor Henry F. Schaefer III.” Schaefer was honored with the $10,000 Joseph O. Hirschfelder Prize in 2005 by the University of Wisconsin's Theoretical Chemistry Institute.

In 2011, Schaefer received the Ide P. Trotter Prize from Texas A&M University. In 2012, he received a Humboldt Research Award from the Alexander von Humboldt Foundation in Germany, and on March 29, 2012, he received the $20,000 SURA Distinguished Scientist Award from the Southeastern Universities Research Association for fulfilling SURA's mission of fostering excellence in scientific research.

In 2013, Schaefer received the Chemical Pioneer Award of the American Institute of Chemists. On March 18, 2014, Schaefer received the American Chemical Society Peter Debye Award in Physical Chemistry. In March 2015, Schaefer was elected as an Honorary Fellow of the Chemical Research Society of India. He returned to India to give his CRSI Honorary Fellow award lecture on February 6, 2016, at Panjab University in Chandigarh. Schaefer received the American Institute of Chemists Gold Medal on May 8, 2019.

== Personal life ==
Schaefer married Karen Rasmussen, a graduate of Wells College and Stanford University, on September 2, 1966. He is an outspoken Christian, and has described himself as sympathetic to teleological arguments, but is primarily a "proponent of Jesus."

=== Religion and science ===
Schaefer is an active Protestant Christian educator who regularly speaks to university audiences, Christian groups and the public on science/faith issues. In 2003, he published Science and Christianity: Conflict or Coherence?, a collection of essays and talks on the subject. A second edition appeared in 2016. He is a member of the Christian Faculty Forum at the University of Georgia. Schaefer wrote the forward to William A. Dembski's 1998 book Mere Creation: Science, Faith and Intelligent Design.

Schaefer is a proponent of intelligent design and a fellow of the Discovery Institute.

== Published books ==
- Schaefer, III., Henry F. (1972). The electronic structure of atoms and molecules; a survey of rigorous quantum mechanical results. Reading, Mass.: Addison-Wesley Pub. Co.
- Schaefer, III., Henry F. (1977). Applications of electronic structure theory. New York: Plenum Press.
- Schaefer, III., Henry F. (1977). Methods of electronic structure theory. New York: Plenum Press.
- Schaefer, III., Henry F. (1984). Quantum chemistry : the development of ab initio methods in molecular electronic structure theory. Oxford [Oxfordshire]: Clarendon Press.
- Schaefer, III., Henry F. (2003). Science and Christianity : conflict or coherence?. Watkinsville, Georgia: Apollos Trust. ISBN 978-0-9742975-0-7.
- Schaefer, III., Henry F. (February 20, 2004). Quantum chemistry : the development of ab initio methods in molecular electronic structure theory. Mineola, NY: Dover Publications. ISBN 978-0-486-43246-5.
- Crawford, T. Daniel; Sherrill, C. David (7 October 2010). "A special issue of Molecular Physics honoring Prof. Henry F. Schaefer III". Molecular Physics. 107 (8–12): 711. doi:10.1080/00268970902909382. S2CID 96916680.
