= Petr Čársky =

Petr Čársky (also spelled Peter Čársky; born 29 May 1942) is a Slovak quantum chemist.

== Life ==
Čársky was born on 29 May 1942 in Banská Bystrica. He obtained in 1968 his Ph.D. at Czechoslovak Academy of Sciences, Prague.

He worked as senior researcher at the Institute of Organic Chemistry and Biochemistry, Czechoslovak Academy of Sciences, Prague (1989–1990). He became in 1990 Theoretical group leader, Jaroslav Heyrovský Institute of Physical Chemistry, Academy of Sciences of the Czech Republic, Prague.

== Research ==
Development of quantum-chemical methods in general. In particular:

- Multireference coupled cluster
- Electron-molecule scattering theory and its applications to high resolution electron energy loss spectroscopy
- Ab initio calculations on molecules with unusual bonding.

== Awards and honors ==
- Fellow of the Czech Learned Society (1994).
- International Academy of Quantum Molecular Science (1994)
