= Péter Szalay (chemist) =

Széchenyi Prize-winning Hungarian chemist

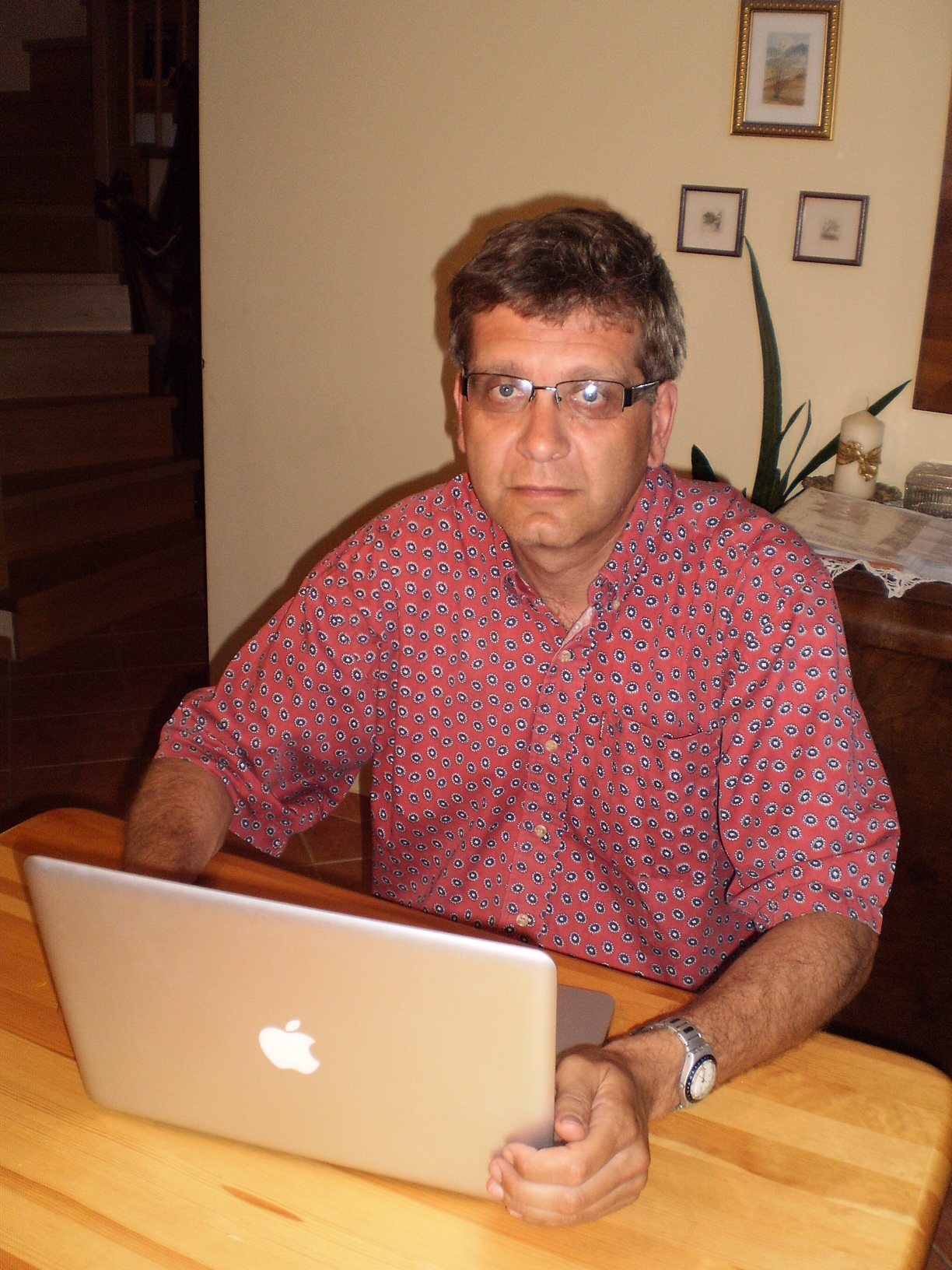
- Portrait of Peter Szalay, Chemist
- Born: June 17, 1962 (age 64)
- Education: Eötvös Loránd University
- Occupations: Chemist, academic
- Awards: Polányi Mihály Prize (2015); Széchenyi Prize (2017); Hungarian Order of Merit (2022)

Péter Szalay (born June 17, 1962, in Szentes) is a Széchenyi Prize-winning Hungarian chemist, member of the International Academy of Quantum Molecular Science and the European Academy of Sciences and Arts and professor at the Eötvös Loránd University.

== Education ==
Szalay graduated from the Zrínyi Miklós High School in Zalaegerszeg in 1980. He received his degree in chemistry from the Eötvös Loránd University of Sciences in 1986. Between 1986 and 1989 he was a doctoral fellow at the Institute of Theoretical Chemistry at the University of Vienna. His supervisor was Professor Hans Lischka. He received his PhD in 1989.

== Academic career ==
Szalay has held various positions at the Department of Chemistry of Eötvös Loránd University since 1986. He is a full professor since 2004 and was director of the Institute of Chemistry between 2005 and 2008.

Between 1991 and 2011, he was a researcher at the University of Florida, the University of Mainz, the University of Texas at Austin and the University of Reims.

His research focuses on quantum chemistry, in particular on theoretical methods for the study of electron structure, molecular spectroscopy and potential surfaces. He has published more than 120 scientific articles and co-authored several books.

== Memberships ==
Szalay was vice president of the "Computational Chemistry Division" of the European Chemical Society from 2011 to 2016 and is the president of the Computational and Theoretical Chemistry Division since 2017.

He is member of the International Academy of Quantum Molecular Science, the Hungarian Academy of Sciences and the European Academy of Sciences and Arts.

== Awards ==
Szalay won the Széchenyi Prize in 2017 and the Polányi Mihály Prize in 2015. He was awarded the Hungarian Order of Merit in 2022.
