= Hellmann–Feynman theorem =

Theorem in quantum mechanics

In quantum mechanics, the Hellmann–Feynman theorem relates the derivative of the total energy with respect to a parameter to the expectation value of the derivative of the Hamiltonian with respect to that same parameter. According to the theorem, once the spatial distribution of the electrons has been determined by solving the Schrödinger equation, all the forces in the system can be calculated using classical electrostatics.

The theorem has been proven independently by many authors, including Paul Güttinger (1932), Wolfgang Pauli (1933), Hans Hellmann (1937) and Richard Feynman (1939).

The theorem states

$\frac{\mathrm{d} E_{\lambda}}{\mathrm{d}{\lambda}} = \bigg\langle\psi_\lambda\bigg|\frac{\mathrm{d}\hat{H}_{\lambda}}{\mathrm{d}\lambda}\bigg|\psi_\lambda\bigg\rangle,$

where

- $\hat{H}_{\lambda}$ is a Hermitian operator depending upon a continuous parameter $\lambda,$
- $|\psi_\lambda\rangle$, is an eigenstate (eigenfunction) of the Hamiltonian, depending implicitly upon $\lambda,$
- $E_{\lambda}\,$ is the energy (eigenvalue) of the state $|\psi_\lambda\rangle$, i.e. $\hat{H}_{\lambda}|\psi_\lambda\rangle = E_{\lambda}|\psi_\lambda\rangle.$

Note that for systems with degenerate states, a refined version of the Hellmann–Feynman theorem is needed.

== Proof ==
This proof of the Hellmann–Feynman theorem requires that the wave function be an eigenfunction of the Hamiltonian under consideration; however, it is also possible to prove more generally that the theorem holds for non-eigenfunction wave functions which are stationary (partial derivative is zero) for all relevant variables (such as orbital rotations). The Hartree–Fock wavefunction is an important example of an approximate eigenfunction that still satisfies the Hellmann–Feynman theorem. Notable example of where the Hellmann–Feynman is not applicable is for example finite-order Møller–Plesset perturbation theory, which is not variational.

The proof also employs an identity of normalized wavefunctions – that derivatives of the overlap of a wave function with itself must be zero. Using Dirac's bra–ket notation these two conditions are written as

$$\hat{H}_{\lambda}|\psi_\lambda\rangle = E_{\lambda}|\psi_\lambda\rangle,$$
$$\langle\psi_\lambda|\psi_\lambda\rangle = 1 \Rightarrow \frac{\mathrm{d}}{\mathrm{d}\lambda}\langle\psi_\lambda|\psi_\lambda\rangle =0.$$

The proof then follows through an application of the derivative product rule to the expectation value of the Hamiltonian viewed as a function of $\lambda$:

$$\begin{align}
\frac{\mathrm{d} E_{\lambda}}{\mathrm{d}\lambda} &= \frac{\mathrm{d}}{\mathrm{d}\lambda}\langle\psi_\lambda|\hat{H}_{\lambda}|\psi_\lambda\rangle \\
&=\bigg\langle\frac{\mathrm{d}\psi_\lambda}{\mathrm{d}\lambda}\bigg|\hat{H}_{\lambda}\bigg|\psi_\lambda\bigg\rangle + \bigg\langle\psi_\lambda\bigg|\hat{H}_{\lambda}\bigg|\frac{\mathrm{d}\psi_\lambda}{\mathrm{d}\lambda}\bigg\rangle + \bigg\langle\psi_\lambda\bigg|\frac{\mathrm{d}\hat{H}_{\lambda}}{\mathrm{d}\lambda}\bigg|\psi_\lambda\bigg\rangle \\
&=E_{\lambda}\bigg\langle\frac{\mathrm{d}\psi_\lambda}{\mathrm{d}\lambda}\bigg|\psi_\lambda\bigg\rangle + E_{\lambda}\bigg\langle\psi_\lambda\bigg|\frac{\mathrm{d}\psi_\lambda}{\mathrm{d}\lambda}\bigg\rangle + \bigg\langle\psi_\lambda\bigg|\frac{\mathrm{d}\hat{H}_{\lambda}}{\mathrm{d}\lambda}\bigg|\psi_\lambda\bigg\rangle \\
&=E_{\lambda}\frac{\mathrm{d}}{\mathrm{d}\lambda}\langle\psi_\lambda|\psi_\lambda\rangle + \bigg\langle\psi_\lambda\bigg|\frac{\mathrm{d}\hat{H}_{\lambda}}{\mathrm{d}\lambda}\bigg|\psi_\lambda\bigg\rangle \\
&=\bigg\langle\psi_\lambda\bigg|\frac{\mathrm{d}\hat{H}_{\lambda}}{\mathrm{d}\lambda}\bigg|\psi_\lambda\bigg\rangle.
\end{align}$$

== Alternate proof ==
The Hellmann–Feynman theorem is actually a direct, and to some extent trivial, consequence of the variational principle (the Rayleigh–Ritz variational principle) from which the Schrödinger equation may be derived. This is why the Hellmann–Feynman theorem holds for wave-functions (such as the Hartree–Fock wave-function) that, though not eigenfunctions of the Hamiltonian, do derive from a variational principle. This is also why it holds, e.g., in density functional theory, e.g. in the adiabatic connection fluctuation dissipation theorem, which is not wave-function based and for which the standard derivation does not apply.

According to the Rayleigh–Ritz variational principle, the eigenfunctions of the Schrödinger equation are stationary points of the functional (which is nicknamed Schrödinger functional for brevity):
$$E[\psi,\lambda]=\frac{\langle\psi|\hat{H}_{\lambda}|\psi\rangle}{\langle\psi|\psi\rangle}.$$
The eigenvalues are the values that the Schrödinger functional takes at the stationary points: $E_{\lambda}=E[\psi_{\lambda},\lambda],$ where $\psi_{\lambda}$ satisfies the variational condition:
$$\left.\frac{\delta E[\psi,\lambda]}{\delta\psi(x)}\right|_{\psi=\psi_{\lambda}}=0.$$
By differentiating the eigenvalues using the chain rule, the following equation is obtained:
$$\frac{\mathrm{d} E_{\lambda}}{\mathrm{d} \lambda}=
\frac{\partial E[\psi_{\lambda},\lambda]}{\partial\lambda}+
\int\frac{\delta E[\psi,\lambda]}{\delta\psi(x)}\frac{\mathrm{d} \psi_{\lambda}(x)}{\mathrm{d} \lambda} \mathrm{d}x.$$
Due to the variational condition, the second term in the previous equation vanishes. Because the Schrödinger functional can only depend explicitly on an external parameter through the Hamiltonian, the theorem trivially follows:
$$\frac{\mathrm{d} E_{\lambda}}{\mathrm{d}{\lambda}}=
\bigg\langle\psi_\lambda\bigg|\frac{\mathrm{d}\hat{H}_{\lambda}}{\mathrm{d}\lambda}\bigg|\psi_\lambda\bigg\rangle$$
In one sentence, the Hellmann–Feynman theorem states that the derivative of the stationary values of a function(al) with respect to a parameter on which it may depend, can be computed from the explicit dependence only, disregarding the implicit one.

== Example applications ==
=== Molecular forces ===
The most common application of the Hellmann–Feynman theorem is the calculation of intramolecular forces in molecules. This allows for the calculation of equilibrium geometries – the nuclear coordinates where the forces acting upon the nuclei, due to the electrons and other nuclei, vanish. The parameter $\lambda$ corresponds to the coordinates of the nuclei. For a molecule with $1\leq i\leq N$ electrons with coordinates $\{\mathbf{r}_i\}$, and $1\leq\alpha\leq M$ nuclei, each located at a specified point $\{\mathbf{R}_\alpha=\{X_\alpha,Y_\alpha,Z_\alpha\}\}$ and with nuclear charge $Z_\alpha$, the clamped nucleus Hamiltonian is

$$\hat{H}=\hat{T} + \hat{U} - \sum_{i=1}^{N}\sum_{\alpha=1}^{M}\frac{Z_{\alpha}}{|\mathbf{r}_{i}-\mathbf{R}_{\alpha}|} + \sum_{\alpha}^{M}\sum_{\beta>\alpha}^{M}\frac{Z_{\alpha}Z_{\beta}}{|\mathbf{R}_{\alpha}-\mathbf{R}_{\beta}|}.$$

The $x$-component of the force acting on a given nucleus is equal to the negative of the derivative of the total energy with respect to that coordinate. Employing the Hellmann–Feynman theorem this is equal to

$$F_{X_{\gamma}} = -\frac{\partial E}{\partial X_{\gamma}} = -\bigg\langle\psi\bigg|\frac{\partial\hat{H}}{\partial X_{\gamma}}\bigg|\psi\bigg\rangle.$$

Only two components of the Hamiltonian contribute to the required derivative – the electron-nucleus and nucleus-nucleus terms. Differentiating the Hamiltonian yields

$$\begin{align}
\frac{\partial\hat{H}}{\partial X_{\gamma}} &= \frac{\partial}{\partial X_{\gamma}} \left(- \sum_{i=1}^{N}\sum_{\alpha=1}^{M}\frac{Z_{\alpha}}{|\mathbf{r}_{i}-\mathbf{R}_{\alpha}|} + \sum_{\alpha}^{M}\sum_{\beta>\alpha}^{M}\frac{Z_{\alpha}Z_{\beta}}{|\mathbf{R}_{\alpha}-\mathbf{R}_{\beta}|}\right), \\
&=-Z_{\gamma}\sum_{i=1}^{N}\frac{x_{i}-X_{\gamma}}{|\mathbf{r}_{i}-\mathbf{R}_{\gamma}|^{3}}
+Z_{\gamma}\sum_{\alpha\neq\gamma}^{M}Z_{\alpha}\frac{X_{\alpha}-X_{\gamma}}{|\mathbf{R}_{\alpha}-\mathbf{R}_{\gamma}|^{3}}.
\end{align}$$

Insertion of this in to the Hellmann–Feynman theorem returns the $x$-component of the force on the given nucleus in terms of the electronic density $\rho(\mathbf{r})$ and the atomic coordinates and nuclear charges:

$$F_{X_{\gamma}} = Z_{\gamma}\left(\int\mathrm{d}\mathbf{r}\ \rho(\mathbf{r})\frac{x-X_{\gamma}}{|\mathbf{r}-\mathbf{R}_{\gamma}|^{3}} - \sum_{\alpha\neq\gamma}^{M}Z_{\alpha}\frac{X_{\alpha}-X_{\gamma}}{|\mathbf{R}_{\alpha}-\mathbf{R}_{\gamma}|^{3}}\right).$$

A comprehensive survey of similar applications of the Hellmann–Feynman theorem in quantum chemistry is given in B. M. Deb (ed.) The Force Concept in Chemistry, Van Nostrand Rheinhold, 1981.

=== Expectation values ===
An alternative approach for applying the Hellmann–Feynman theorem is to promote a fixed or discrete parameter which appears in a Hamiltonian to be a continuous variable solely for the mathematical purpose of taking a derivative. Possible parameters are physical constants or discrete quantum numbers. As an example, the radial Schrödinger equation for a hydrogen-like atom is

$$\hat{H}_{l}=-\frac{\hbar^{2}}{2\mu r^2}\left(\frac{\mathrm{d}}{\mathrm{d}r}\left(r^{2}\frac{\mathrm{d}}{\mathrm{d}r}\right)-l(l+1)\right) -\frac{Ze^{2}}{r},$$

which depends upon the discrete azimuthal quantum number $l$. Promoting $l$ to be a continuous parameter allows for the derivative of the Hamiltonian to be taken:

$$\frac{\partial \hat{H}_{l}}{\partial l} = \frac{\hbar^{2}}{2\mu r^{2}}(2l+1).$$

The Hellmann–Feynman theorem then allows for the determination of the expectation value of $\frac{1}{r^{2}}$ for hydrogen-like atoms:

$$\begin{align}
\bigg\langle\psi_{nl}\bigg|\frac{1}{r^{2}}\bigg|\psi_{nl}\bigg\rangle &= \frac{2\mu}{\hbar^{2}}\frac{1}{2l+1}\bigg\langle\psi_{nl}\bigg|\frac{\partial \hat{H}_{l}}{\partial l}\bigg|\psi_{nl}\bigg\rangle \\
&=\frac{2\mu}{\hbar^{2}}\frac{1}{2l+1}\frac{\partial E_{n}}{\partial l} \\
&=\frac{2\mu}{\hbar^{2}}\frac{1}{2l+1}\frac{\partial E_{n}}{\partial n}\frac{\partial n}{\partial l} \\
&=\frac{2\mu}{\hbar^{2}}\frac{1}{2l+1}\frac{Z^{2}\mu e^{4}}{\hbar^{2}n^{3}} \\
&=\frac{Z^{2}\mu^{2}e^{4}}{\hbar^{4}n^{3}(l+1/2)}.
\end{align}$$

In order to compute the energy derivative, the way $n$ depends on $l$ has to be known. These quantum numbers are usually independent, but here the solutions must be varied so as to keep the number of nodes in the wavefunction fixed. The number of nodes is $n-l-1$, so $\partial n/\partial l=1$.

=== Van der Waals forces ===
In the end of Feynman's paper, he states that, "Van der Waals' forces can also be interpreted as arising from charge distributions with higher concentration between the nuclei. The Schrödinger perturbation theory for two interacting atoms at a separation $R$, large compared to the radii of the atoms, leads to the result that the charge distribution of each is distorted from central symmetry, a dipole moment of order $1/R^7$ being induced in each atom. The negative charge distribution of each atom has its center of gravity moved slightly toward the other. It is not the interaction of these dipoles which leads to van der Waals's force, but rather the attraction of each nucleus for the distorted charge distribution of its own electrons that gives the attractive $1/R^7$ force."

== Hellmann–Feynman theorem for time-dependent wavefunctions ==
For a general time-dependent wavefunction satisfying the time-dependent Schrödinger equation, the Hellmann–Feynman theorem is not valid. However, the following identity holds:

$$\bigg\langle\Psi_\lambda(t)\bigg|\frac{\partial H_\lambda}{\partial\lambda}\bigg|\Psi_\lambda(t)\bigg\rangle = i \hbar \frac{\partial}{\partial t}\bigg\langle\Psi_\lambda(t)\bigg|\frac{\partial \Psi_\lambda(t)}{\partial \lambda}\bigg\rangle$$

For

$$i\hbar\frac{\partial\Psi_\lambda(t)}{\partial t}=H_\lambda\Psi_\lambda(t)$$

=== Proof ===
The proof only relies on the Schrödinger equation and the assumption that partial derivatives with respect to λ and t can be interchanged.

$$\begin{align}
\bigg\langle\Psi_\lambda(t)\bigg|\frac{\partial H_\lambda}{\partial\lambda}\bigg|\Psi_\lambda(t)\bigg\rangle &=
\frac{\partial}{\partial\lambda}\langle\Psi_\lambda(t)|H_\lambda|\Psi_\lambda(t)\rangle
- \bigg\langle\frac{\partial\Psi_\lambda(t)}{\partial\lambda}\bigg|H_\lambda\bigg|\Psi_\lambda(t)\bigg\rangle
- \bigg\langle\Psi_\lambda(t)\bigg|H_\lambda\bigg|\frac{\partial\Psi_\lambda(t)}{\partial\lambda}\bigg\rangle \\
&= i\hbar \frac{\partial}{\partial\lambda}\bigg\langle\Psi_\lambda(t)\bigg|\frac{\partial\Psi_\lambda(t)}{\partial t}\bigg\rangle
- i\hbar\bigg\langle\frac{\partial\Psi_\lambda(t)}{\partial\lambda}\bigg|\frac{\partial\Psi_\lambda(t)}{\partial t}\bigg\rangle
+  i\hbar\bigg\langle\frac{\partial\Psi_\lambda(t)}{\partial t}\bigg|\frac{\partial\Psi_\lambda(t)}{\partial\lambda}\bigg\rangle \\
&= i\hbar \bigg\langle\Psi_\lambda(t)\bigg| \frac{\partial^2\Psi_\lambda(t)}{\partial\lambda \partial t}\bigg\rangle
+  i\hbar\bigg\langle\frac{\partial\Psi_\lambda(t)}{\partial t}\bigg|\frac{\partial\Psi_\lambda(t)}{\partial\lambda}\bigg\rangle \\
&= i \hbar \frac{\partial}{\partial t}\bigg\langle\Psi_\lambda(t)\bigg|\frac{\partial \Psi_\lambda(t)}{\partial \lambda}\bigg\rangle
\end{align}$$
