= Odile Eisenstein =

French chemist (born 1949)

- Born: 4 June 1949 (age 77); Boulogne-Billancourt, France
- Education: University of Paris-Sud, Orsay
- Known for: Computational chemistry Organometallic chemistry

Odile Eisenstein ForMemRS is a theoretical chemist who specializes in modelling the structure and reactivity of transition metals and lanthanide complexes. She is currently the equivalent of an emeritus Professor at the Institut Charles Gerhardt Montpellier, équipe CTMM at Montpellier 2 University and a professor at the Hylleraas Centre for Quantum Molecular Sciences at the University of Oslo. She has been a member of the French Academy of Sciences since 2013, as the first female elected. In 2018 she was awarded the «insignes d'officier dans l’ordre de la Légion d'honneur» at the Institut de France in Paris.

== Education ==
In 1977, Odile Eisenstein attended University of Paris-Sud where she earned a Ph.D. in chemistry with Nguyen Trong Anh and Lionel Salem. She obtained postdoctoral appointments with Jack D. Dunitz at ETH Zurich and Roald Hoffmann at Cornell University. Here, she did work on the nature of transition metal-olefin bonding interactions. She began her independent career at the University of Michigan at Ann Arbor in 1982.
