= Evert Jan Baerends =

Dutch theoretical chemist

Evert Jan Baerends (born 17 September 1945) is a Dutch theoretical chemist. He is an emeritus professor of the Vrije Universiteit Amsterdam. Baerends is known for his development and application of electronic structure calculations, which over time led to the development of the Amsterdam Density Functional. He worked extensively on density functional theory.

== Career ==
Baerends was born on 17 September 1945 in Voorst. He obtained his PhD at the Vrije Universiteit Amsterdam under professor Pieter Ros. Baerends became a professor of Theoretical chemistry at the Vrije Universiteit Amsterdam. He did extensive research on density functional theory and was involved in the development and application of electronic structure calculations, which later led to the development of the Amsterdam Density Functional.

Baerends became a member of the Royal Netherlands Academy of Arts and Sciences in 2004. In 2010 he was awarded the Schrödinger Medal by the World Association of Theoretical and Computational Chemists, being noted for: "For his pioneering contributions to the development of computational density functional methods and his fundamental contributions to density functional theory and density matrix theory." Baerends is a member of the International Academy of Quantum Molecular Science.

After his retirement in the Netherlands Baerends lectured at Pohang University of Science and Technology in South Korea. In 2019 he received an honorary doctorate from the University of Girona.
