= Kieron Burke =

American chemistry researcher

- Education: University of California, Santa Barbara (PhD)
- Known for: Density Functional Theory
- Awards: Fellow of the American Physical Society
- Scientific career
- Fields: Quantum Mechanics, Density Functional Theory
- Institutions: University of California, Irvine (UCI)

Kieron Burke is an American chemistry researcher. He is a professor known for his work in the field of quantum mechanics, particularly in developing and advancing density functional theory (DFT). He holds joint appointments as a distinguished professor in the Departments of Chemistry and Physics at the University of California, Irvine (UCI).

== Career and research ==
Burke primarily researches on density functional theory (DFT), which is a way to solve quantum mechanics equation for electrons in any substance. He contributed to various areas within the field, including in ACFD, thermal DFT, and using machine learning in calculations regarding DFT.

== Recognition ==
Burke is a fellow of the American Physical Society, the British Royal Society of Chemistry, and the American Association for the Advancement of Science. He is also a member of the International Academy of Quantum Molecular Sciences.

== Selected publications ==
- Thermal Density Functional Theory in Context
- Exact Conditions and Approximations in Density Functional Theory
