= Benedetta Mennucci =

Italian theoretical chemist

Benedetta Mennucci (born 1969) is an Italian theoretical chemist who is professor at the University of Pisa. She is a developer of the polarizable continuum model.

== Early life and education ==
Mennucci obtained her Laurea in Chemistry in 1994 and her Ph.D. award in Chemistry in 1999. The PhD thesis had the title "Theoretical Models and Computational Applications of Molecular Phenomena Involving the Environment Effect".

== Research and career ==
Benedetta Mennucci was appointed Full Professor of Physical Chemistry in 2012 at the Department of Chemistry at the University of Pisa, where she leads the MoLECoLab research group.

She is Senior Editor for The Journal of Physical Chemistry Letters, member of the Editorial Advisory Board of Chemical Reviews, Journal of Chemical Theory and Computation, and Cell Reports Physical Science, and member of the Editorial Board of Theoretical Chemistry Accounts.

Her research focuses on the development of computational approaches which integrate quantum chemistry with classical models to describe processes of chemical and biological systems of increasing complexity. She is a main developer of the polarizable continuum model to predict solvent effects in computational chemistry. In the last years, her main research activity has moved towards the development and the application of polarizable embedding QM/MM methods for modelling light-induced processes in proteins. She is a contributor to the Gaussian (software) and she has co-authored more than 300 publications, including reviews and book chapters. Mennucci is co-author of the book "Continuum Solvation Models in Chemical Physics: From Theory to Applications".

== Awards and honours ==
Mennucci is a member of the International Academy of Quantum Molecular Science and an elected board member of the World Association of Theoretical and Computational Chemists. Mennucci is also listed on AcademiaNet.

- 2011 European Research Council Starting Grant
- 2017 European Research Council Advanced Grant
