= Gustavo Scuseria =

American chemist

Gustavo E. Scuseria
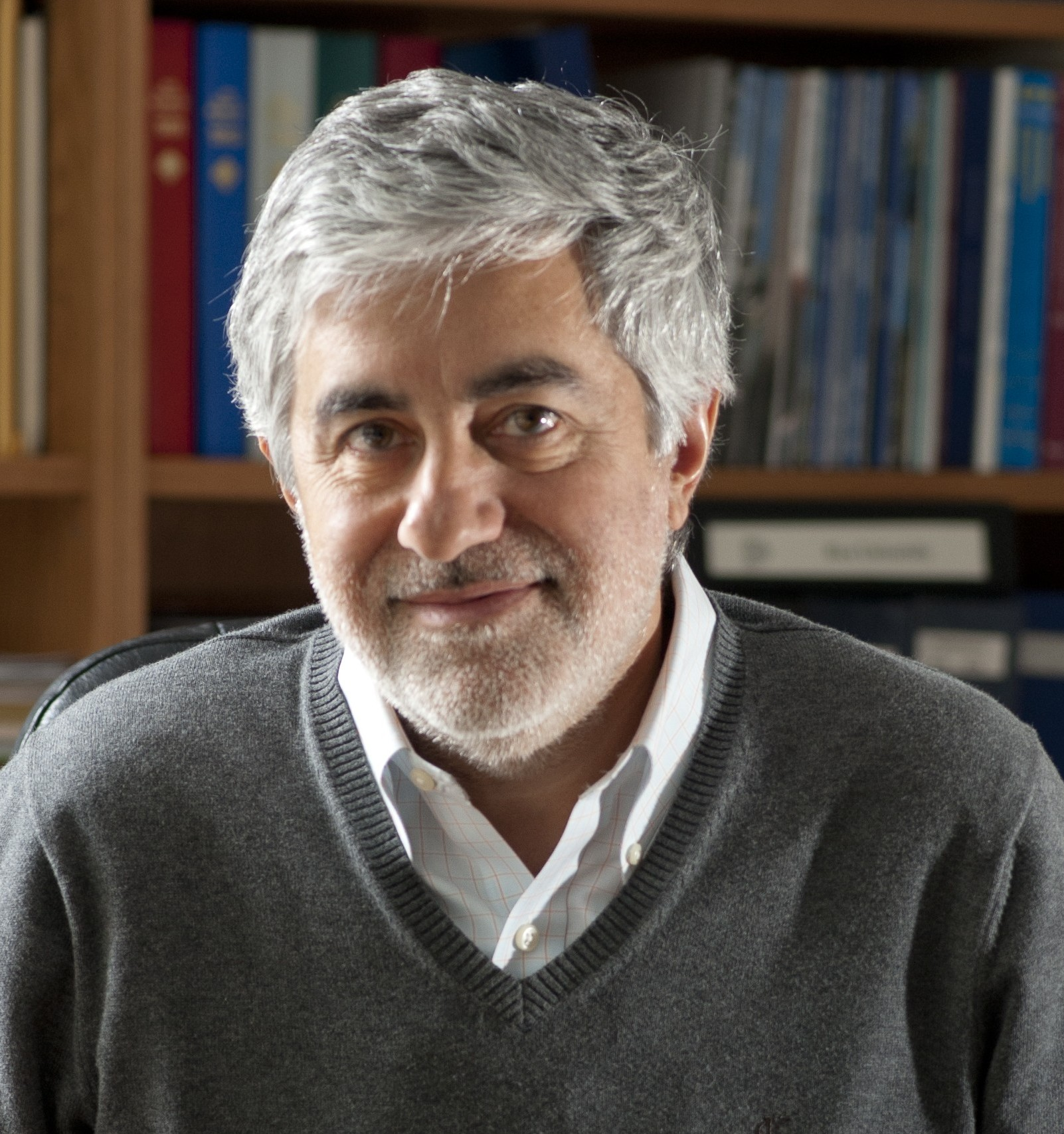
- Professor Scuseria, Houston, TX, 2011
- Website: http://scuseria.rice.edu/

Gustavo E. Scuseria is the Robert A. Welch Professor of Chemistry, Professor of Physics & Astronomy and Professor of Materials Science & NanoEngineering at Rice University, Houston, TX. He served as Associate Editor of the Journal of Chemical Theory and Computation from 2006-2009, then as Co-Editor-in-Chief from 2009-2021 for a total of 15 years with the journal. Scuseria earned his PhD in Physics from the University of Buenos Aires in 1983 and conducted post-doctoral work at the University of California, Berkeley (1985–1987) and the University of Georgia (1987–1989) prior to joining the chemistry faculty at Rice University in 1989. He received joint appointments at Rice as a Professor of Physics and Astronomy in 2009, and as a Professor of Materials Science and NanoEngineering in 2013.

== Research ==
Scuseria's research is in electronic structure theory, primarily density functional theory, coupled cluster methods, and methods for strongly correlated electrons. With Jochen Heyd and Matthias Ernzerhof, he developed the HSE screened hybrid exchange–correlation functional used in first-principles studies of the electronic structure of solids. This approach is a practical implementation of hybrid methods which are an improvement over many other approaches, particularly for band gaps, and is implemented in codes including WIEN2k, VASP and ABINIT. His group has also worked on linear-scaling electronic structure methods, Gaussian-orbital implementations for periodic systems, symmetry-projected mean-field theory, and approaches based on the Jordan–Wigner transformation for strongly correlated systems.

== Selected honors and awards ==
- Scuseria is a Fellow of the American Association for the Advancement of Science, the American Physical Society, the Royal Society of Chemistry, and the American Chemical Society.
- 2024 Aneesur Rahman Prize for Computational Physics, American Physical Society
- 2024 Schrödinger Medal, World Association of Theoretical and Computational Chemists
- 2024 Materials Theory Award, Materials Research Society
- 2022 ACS Award in Theoretical Chemistry, American Chemical Society
- 2017 S F Boys–A Rahman Award, Royal Society of Chemistry (RSC)
- 2015 Humboldt Research Award, Alexander von Humboldt Foundation
- 2010 Feynman Prize in Nanotechnology (Theory category), Foresight Institute
- He is an elected member of the International Academy of Quantum Molecular Science, where he served as Vice President from 2012-2018 and as President from 2023-2026.
