= Adiabatic connection fluctuation dissipation theorem =

Quantum-mechanical simulation framework

In density functional theory (DFT) the adiabatic-connection fluctuation-dissipation theorem (ACFD) is an exact formula for the Kohn–Sham correlation energy. A connection between noninteracting electrons and interacting electrons (the adiabatic connection (AC)) is combined with the random density fluctuations of molecular or solid systems (fluctuation-dissipation (FD)). It is used as a tool in theoretical chemistry and quantum chemistry to approximate the electronic energy.

The theorem states

$E_{c}^{\text{ACFD}}[\rho]=\frac{-1}{2\pi}\int_{0}^{1}d\alpha\iint drdr'f_{H}(r,r')\int_{0}^{\infty}d\omega[\chi_{\alpha}(r,r',\omega)-\chi_{0}(r,r',\omega)]$	1

where $f_{H}(r,r')=\frac{1}{|r-r'|}$ is the Hartree kernel, $\chi_{\alpha}(r,r',\omega)$ the interacting dynamic response function, $\chi_{0}(r,r',\omega)$ the dynamic Kohn–Sham (KS) response function from time-dependent density functional theory (TDDFT).

== History ==
The ACFD theorem in its modern form for density functional theory has been discovered independently by many researches such as D. C. Langreth and J. P. Perdew in 1975, 1977 respectively, by J. Harris together with A. Griffin and R. O. Jones in 1974/75 and by O. Gunnarson and B. I. Lundqvist in 1976. It has since gained interest more recently since 2010 in theoretical chemistry and quantum chemistry with increasing computational power.

== Proof ==
=== Adiabatic-connection (AC) theorem ===
The adiabatic connection (AC) is a perturbation theory along the electron–electron interaction $\hat{V}_\text{ee}=\sum_{i<j}\frac{1}{|r_{i}-r_{j}|}$ with the coupling strength $0\leq\alpha\leq 1$ from the Kohn–Sham (KS) system of non-interacting electrons $\alpha=0$ towards the real system of interacting electrons $\alpha=1$ and given by the following perturbative Schrödinger equation

$$[\overbrace{\hat{T}+\hat{v}(\alpha)+\alpha\hat{V}_\text{ee}}^{\hat{H}(\alpha)}]\Psi(\alpha)=E(\alpha)\Psi(\alpha)$$

$\hat{H}(\alpha)$ is the coupling-constant dependent many-body Hamiltonian. $\hat{T}=\sum_{i}-\frac{1}{2}\Delta_{i}$ is the many-body kinetic energy operator with the Laplacian $\Delta=\nabla^{2}$, where the indices $i,j$ correspond to the respective electron coordinates, $\hat{v}(\alpha)=\sum_{i}v_{i}(\alpha)$ is the local coupling-strength-dependent potential. Note there that $\hat{v}(\alpha=0)=\hat{v}_{S}$ is the Kohn–Sham (KS) potential, $\hat{v}(\alpha=1)=\hat{v}_\text{ext}$ the external potential, i.e. electron-nuclei interaction, $\Psi(\alpha=0)=\Phi_{S}$ the Kohn–Sham (KS) Slater determinant, $\Psi(\alpha=1)=\Psi_{0}$ the real electronic ground state wave function, $E(\alpha=0)=E_{S}$ is the energy of the KS system, $E(\alpha=1)=E_{0}$ is the real electronic ground state energy. Thus accordingly for $\alpha=0$ the many-body Kohn–Sham (KS) equation is obtained

$$[\hat{T}+\hat{v}_{S}]\Phi_{S}=E_{S}\Phi_{S}$$

while for $\alpha=1$ the electronic Schrödinger equation is obtained within the Born–Oppenheimer approximation

$$[\hat{T}+\hat{v}_\text{ext}+\hat{V}_\text{ee}]\Psi_{0}=E_{0}\Psi_{0}$$

The coupling-constant-dependent correlation energy is given as difference of the energy of the interacting system minus that of the artificial KS system in bra–ket notation

$$E_{c}(\alpha)=\langle\Psi(\alpha)|\hat{H}(\alpha)|\Psi(\alpha)\rangle-\langle\Phi_{S}|\hat{H}(\alpha)|\Phi_{S}\rangle$$

which can be simplified further with the fact, that the density along the adiabatic-connection stays fixed, and the locality of the potential $\langle \Psi_{0}|v(\alpha)|\Phi_{0} \rangle = \int\rho(r)v(\alpha,r)dr = \langle\Phi_{S}|v(\alpha)|\Phi_{S}\rangle$ (This also accounts for the derivative $\frac{dv(\alpha)}{d\alpha}$ which hence cancel out) and apply the Hellmann–Feynman theorem with differentiating the Hamiltonian $\frac{d\hat{H}(\alpha)}{d\alpha}=\frac{d}{d\alpha}(\hat{T}+\hat{v}(\alpha)+\alpha\hat{V}_\text{ee})=\frac{d\hat{v}(\alpha)}{d\alpha}+\hat{V}_\text{ee}$

$$\frac{dE_{c}(\alpha)}{d\alpha}=\bigg\langle\Psi(\alpha)\bigg|\frac{d\hat{H}(\alpha)}{d\alpha}\bigg|\Psi(\alpha)\bigg\rangle-\bigg\langle\Phi_{S}\bigg|\frac{d\hat{H}(\alpha)}{d\alpha}\bigg|\Phi_{S}\bigg\rangle$$
$$\frac{dE_{c}(\alpha)}{d\alpha}=\langle\Psi(\alpha)|\hat{V}_\text{ee}|\Psi(\alpha)\rangle-\langle\Phi_{S}|\hat{V}_\text{ee}|\Phi_{S}\rangle$$

Lastly the fundamental theorem of calculus to obtain the correlation energy back is used, which completes the adiabatic-connection (AC) theorem

$E^{\text{AC}}_{c}[\rho]=\int_{0}^{1}d\alpha\frac{dE_{c}(\alpha)}{d\alpha}=E_{c}(\alpha=1)-\underbrace{E_{c}(\alpha=0)}_{0}=\int_{0}^{1}d\alpha\langle\Psi(\alpha)|\hat{V}_\text{ee}|\Psi(\alpha)\rangle-\langle\Phi_{S}|\hat{V}_\text{ee}|\Phi_{S}\rangle$	2

=== Fluctuation-dissipation (FD) theorem ===
The fluctuation-dissipation theorem, first proven by Herbert Callen and Theodore A. Welton in 1951, can be reformulated in a modern way for density functional theory to incorporate random fluctuations in the density. The full proof in detail is rather complicated and given in reference. Some key features will be pointed out here. The response functions are integrated along the frequencies

$$\int_{0}^{\infty}d\omega\ \chi(r,r',\omega)=-2\sum_{n\neq 0}\underbrace{\int_{0}^{\infty}\frac{E_{n}-E_{0}}{(E_{n}-E_{0})^{2}+\omega^{2}}d\omega}_{\bigg[\arctan\bigg(\frac{\omega}{E_{n}-E_{0}}\bigg)\bigg]_{0}^{\infty}=\frac{\pi}{2}}\langle\Psi_{0}|\hat{\rho}(r)|\Psi_{n}\rangle\langle\Psi_{n}|\hat{\rho}(r')|\Psi_{0}\rangle$$

where $\hat{\rho}(r)=\sum_{i}\delta(r_{i}-r)$ is the density operator, a sum of Dirac delta functions, the indices $0$ correspond to the ground state, $n$ to excited states, letting the sum start from $n=0$, rather than $n\neq 0$ with the identity operator $\sum_{n=0}|\Psi_{n}\rangle\langle\Psi_{n}|=1$ and with introducing the 2-electron pair density

$$\rho_{2}(r,r')=\frac{1}{2}\langle\Psi_{0}|\hat{\rho}(r)\hat{\rho}(r')|\Psi_{0}\rangle_{N-2}=\langle\Psi_{0}|\hat{V}_\text{ee}|\Psi_{0}\rangle$$

after some tedious algebra obtains the fluctuation-dissipation (FD) theorem

$E_{c}^{\text{FD}}[\rho]=-\frac{1}{2\pi}\iint drdr'f_{H}(r,r')\int_{0}^{\infty}d\omega[\chi_{\alpha}(r,r',\omega)-\chi_{0}(r,r',\omega)]=\langle\Psi(\alpha)|\hat{V}_\text{ee}|\Psi(\alpha)\rangle-\langle\Phi_{S}|\hat{V}_\text{ee}|\Phi_{S}\rangle$	3

Combination of the adiabatic-connection (AC) theorem eq. (2) with the fluctuation-dissipation (FD) theorem eq. (3) yields finally the adiabatic-connection fluctuation-dissipation (ACFD) theorem eq. (1).

== Applications of the ACFD theorem within linear-response time-dependent density functional theory in the framework of the random phase approximation ==
Only the Kohn–Sham (KS) response function is explicitly known in terms of occupied (denotes as $i$) and unoccupied (denotes as $a$) Kohn–Sham (KS) orbitals $\varphi$ and KS eigenvalues $\varepsilon$ and is given by

$$\chi_{0}(r,r',\omega)=4\sum_{i}\sum_{a}\frac{\varepsilon_{i}-\varepsilon_{a}}{(\varepsilon_{i}-\varepsilon_{a})^{2}+\omega^{2}}\varphi_{i}(r)\varphi_{a}(r)\varphi_{a}(r')\varphi_{i}(r')$$

The interacting response function is calculated from the Petersilka–Gossmann–Gross TDDFT Dyson equation

$\chi_{\alpha}(r,r',\omega)=\chi_{0}(r,r',\omega)+\iint dr''dr'''\chi_{0}(r,r'',\omega)f_\text{Hxc}^{\alpha}(r'',r''',\omega)\chi_{\alpha}(r,r''',\omega)$	4

while the exchange-correlation (xc) kernel dependens nonlinearly on the coupling strength and the Hartree (H) kernel linearly. Invoking the random phase approximation (RPA) i.e. $f_\text{Hxc}^{\alpha}(r',r'',\omega)\approx\alpha f_{H}(r,r') ;~ f_\text{xc}^{\alpha}(r',r'',\omega)\approx 0$. That means approximating the Hartree-exchange-correlation (Hxc) kernel with the Hartree kernel or neglecting the exchange-correlation kernel entirely, one obtains the RPA correlation energy while introducing a basis set in matrix notation, if the TDDFT Dyson equation eq. (4) is plugged into the ACFD theorem eq. (1). The coupling constant integration can then be carried out analytically.

$E_{c}^{\text{RPA}}[\{\varphi_{s},\varepsilon_{s}\}]=-\frac{1}{2\pi}\int_{0}^{1}d\alpha\int_{0}^{\infty}d\omega\operatorname{Tr}[[[1-\alpha\chi_{0}(\omega)f_{H}]^{-1}-1]\chi_{0}(\omega)f_{H}]=-\frac{1}{2\pi}\int_{0}^{\infty}d\omega\operatorname{Tr}[\ln[1-\chi_{0}(\omega)f_{H}]+\chi_{0}(\omega)f_{H}]$	5

where the trace operator $\operatorname{Tr}\equiv\iint drdr'$ corresponds to carrying out the spatial integrations, the index $s$ stands for both occupied and unoccupied KS orbitals. Note here that the RPA correlation energy is a highly KS orbital-dependent functional and is one of the most sophisticated approximations to the correlation energy. It is mostly done in a post-SCF manner. That means the KS orbitals and eigenvalues from a preceding KS calculation such as a generalized gradient approximation like e.g. PBE or hybrid calculation like PBE0 and B3LYP are used.
