= Norman Allinger =

American chemist

Norman Louis Allinger
- Born: Norman Louis Allinger; 6 April 1928; Alameda, California, U.S.
- Died: 8 July 2020 (aged 92); Athens, Georgia, U.S.
- Education: University of California (BS); University of California, Los Angeles (PhD)
- Known for: MM2, MM3 and MM4
- Spouses: Janet Waldron; Irene Saez
- Children: Ilene Suzanne; James Augustus; Alan Louis
- Awards: See list
- Scientific career
- Fields: Computational chemistry Molecular mechanics
- Institutions: University of Georgia
- Thesis: The paracyclophanes. (1954)
- Doctoral advisor: Donald J. Cram

Norman "Lou" Allinger (6 April 1928 – 8 July 2020) was an American organic and computational chemist and Distinguished Research Professor Emeritus of Chemistry at the University of Georgia (UGA) in Athens.

Lou Allinger was the elder of two children of Norman Clark Allinger (a bank employee) and Florence Helen (née Young). He was born in Alameda, California. His mother died, aged 75, on 3 January 1982. His father died on 3 July 1983, aged 82.

“From the age of nine on he was always employed in some fashion, first at the age of nine selling magazines and newspapers, then later as an ice-man, a part-time mail carrier, an apricot-picker, a butcher’s apprentice, and a warehouseman, loading tin cans onto railway cars”.

Allinger always had an interest in science, starting with astronomy at age 9 and pursuing that hobby with friends for many years, including his college years when he assembled a 6-inch Newtonian reflector using lenses he had ground himself. He began chemistry as a hobby around 10 or 11 and won a Boy Scout merit badge in the subject at age 13. Aged 17, Allinger was experimenting with a highly dangerous mixture of magnesium and red phosphorus with three teenage friends in his bedroom at home. It resulted in an explosion which severely injured one friend. Lou escaped with "multiple cuts about the face and upper body".

Allinger attended Alameda High School and then, aged 18, he enlisted in the US Army, and was stationed in Fairbanks, Alaska. After his term of enlistment Allinger attended the University of California, Berkeley, from where he graduated with a BS in chemistry in 1951.

For his PhD he moved to University of California, Los Angeles, to work with Donald J. Cram. He was awarded the degree in 1954. Allinger then crossed the country to Harvard, where he worked with Paul Bartlett.

In 1956 Allinger joined the faculty of Wayne State University, becoming a full professor of chemistry in 1960. After thirteen years in Detroit he moved to the University of Georgia as Research Professor. Allinger became the founding editor of the Journal of Computational Chemistry, the first issue of which appeared in 1980.

“Professor Allinger is honored for his pioneering work in computational chemistry, his seminal contributions to the development of the molecular mechanics series of force fields, their widespread application to the fundamental understanding of molecular structure and energetics, and their implementation as a significant tool for practicing chemists”. He was the senior author of the MM2, MM3, and MM4 molecular mechanics software packages.

Allinger published more than 360 papers in his career.

== Awards and honours ==
- 1958 Alfred P. Sloan Research Fellow 1958
- 1982 ACS Herty Medal
- 1985 elected an honorary member of the Serbian Chemical Society
- 1989 Arthur C. Cope Award
- 1989 James Flack Norris Award in Physical Organic Chemistry from the American Chemical Society (ACS)
- 1991 Elected to the National Academy of Sciences
- 1994 Chemical Pioneer Award from the American Institute of Chemists
- 1996 ACS Award of Computers in Chemistry & Pharmaceutical Research
- 1996 The Schrödinger Medal of the World Association of Theoretically Oriented Chemists
- 2002 Benjamin Franklin Medal of the Franklin Institute.

Away from chemistry, Lou Allinger was a jazz musician, pianist and tenor banjo player, who performed at “jazz dives” for more than six decades. He appeared in two albums with the band Sundown Stompers”. He retired from playing music in 2008.

Allinger was a philatelist with a very large worldwide collection of used stamps. "For the last ten years of his life, Lou would show up in the lab at 7 AM. At noon or a bit later, he would go home to have lunch with his wife. Thereafter, he would work on his stamp collection for an hour or two, followed by an afternoon nap." He was also a lifetime lover of baseball, supporting the Atlanta Braves fan once he had moved to Georgia; and a life long champion of the Boy Scout movement. Before his funeral the family requested that, in lieu of flowers, donations be made in Dr. Allinger’s name to the Boy Scouts of America.

== Family ==
Norman Louis Allinger married Janet Waldron on 14 August 1952 in Los Angeles. They published a paper on conformational analysis in 1960 and several thereafter. They had four children the first of whom, Gregory Edward, died at birth on 7 January 1962 in Detroit. The others were Ilene Suzanne, James Augustus and Alan Louis, all of whom survived their father. Janet Waldron Allinger, who was born in Georgia, died in Athens in 1991, aged 62.

Lou married Irene Saez in 1992, whose three children all survived their stepfather.

Norman Louis Allinger died in Athens on 8 July 2020. Lou and Janet are buried at Athens Memory Gardens in Georgia.
