= Keiji Morokuma =

Japanese theoretical chemist (1934-2017)

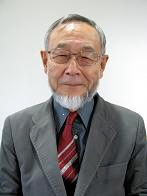
- Born: July 12, 1934; Kagoshima, Kagoshima Prefecture, Japan
- Died: November 27, 2017 (aged 83); Kyoto, Japan
- Education: Kyoto University
- Scientific career
- Institutions: Kyoto University; University of Rochester; Institute for Molecular Science; Emory University
- Doctoral advisor: Kenichi Fukui
- Other academic advisors: Martin Karplus
- Notable students: Marcin Hoffmann (postdoc)

Keiji Morokuma (諸熊 奎治, Morokuma Keiji; July 12, 1934 – November 27, 2017) was a Japanese theoretical chemist and chemical engineer known for developing energy decomposition analysis for molecular interactions and the ONIOM method in quantum chemistry.

== Education and career ==
Morokuma was born in Kagoshima, Kagoshima Prefecture and studied engineering at Kyoto University. As a student of the Nobel laureate Kenichi Fukui, one of the pioneers of quantum chemistry in Japan, at Kyoto University, Morokuma received his doctorate in 1963 in fuel chemistry. He became research associate at Kyoto University until 1966, when he became a postdoc at Harvard University with Martin Karplus working on reaction dynamics as a Fulbright visiting scholar. Afterwards, he joined the Department of Chemistry at the University of Rochester as an assistant professor in 1967 and eventually became a full professor in 1971. He stayed at Rochester until 1976 before moving to the Institute for Molecular Science in Okazaki, Japan and worked there until 1993. From 1978 to 1993, Morokuma was also the director of the Computer Center at the institute. In 1993, Morokuma moved back to the US and became the William Henry Emerson Professor of Chemistry at Emory University. He retired from Emory University in 2006 and traveled back to Japan, where he became a senior research fellow at the Fukui Institute for Fundamental Chemistry in Kyoto University. He remained in Kyoto until his death in 2017.

Morokuma developed the ONIOM method, a method that integrates molecular orbit methods and those of molecular mechanics at several levels and uses them to calculate large molecules. He investigated potential surfaces in chemical reactions and reactions and structure of nanoparticles, proteins and transition metal complexes as well as photochemistry of excited state molecules and biomolecules.

== Honors and awards ==
Morokuma was a Sloan Research Fellow in 1970. In 1978, he received the Prize of the International Academy of Quantum Molecular Science, of which he was a member. In 1991, he was the first to receive the Schrödinger Medal. In 1992 the Prize of the Japanese Chemical Society, in 2005 the Fukui Medal of the Asian Pacific Association of Theoretical & Computational Chemists and in 2008 the Imperial Prize of the Japan Academy. In 2009, he was recognized as the Person of Cultural Merit in Japan.
