= Raymond Daudel =

French chemist

- Born: 2 February 1920; Paris, France
- Died: 20 June 2006 (aged 86); Ivry-sur-Seine, Val-de-Marne, Île-de-France, France
- Education: Paris Sciences et Lettres University
- Scientific career
- Fields: Theoretical chemistry Quantum chemistry
- Workplaces: Sorbonne University
- Doctoral advisor: Irène Joliot-Curie

Raymond Daudel (2 February 1920 – 20 June 2006) was a French theoretical and quantum chemist.

Trained as a physicist, he was an assistant to Irène Joliot-Curie at the Radium Institute. Daudel spent almost the entirety of his career as professor at the Sorbonne and director of a laboratory of the Centre National de la Recherche Scientifique (CNRS). He is quoted as saying that the latter "was much better because the CNRS was very rich". This allowed Daudel to attract many co-workers from elsewhere in France and internationally.

Raymond Daudel was Officier de la Légion d'honneur and Officier de l'Ordre National du Mérite. He served as President of the European Academy of Arts Sciences and Humanities, in Paris, France. Daudel was a founding member and Honorary President of the International Academy of Quantum Molecular Science.

An author as well as an academic, Raymond Daudel authored several books, including Quantum chemistry, originally with R. Lefebyre and C. Moser in 1959 (Interscience Publishers, Inc., New York) and later with G. Leroy, D. Peeters, and M. Sana, published by Wiley in 1983. He was responsible for the organization of the first International Congress in Quantum Chemistry, held in Menton, France in 1973.
