= Camille Sandorfy =

Hungarian-Canadian quantum chemist

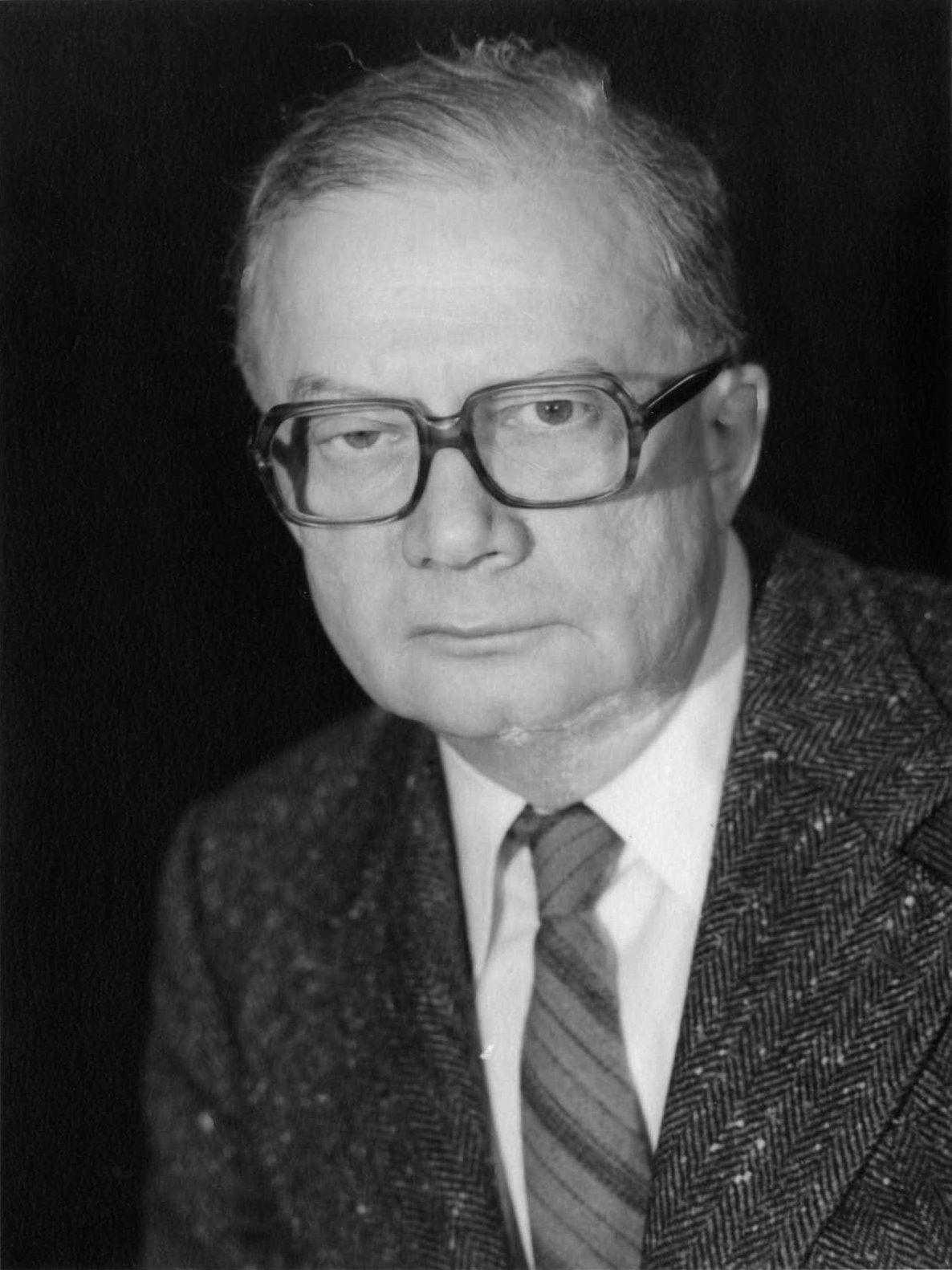
- Sandorfy in 1983
- Born: 9 December 1920; Budapest, Hungary
- Died: 6 June 2006 (aged 85); Paris, France
- Occupation: Quantum chemist
- Awards: Order of Canada; National Order of Quebec

Camille Sandorfy, OC CQ FRSC (9 December 1920 – 6 June 2006) was a Hungarian - Canadian quantum chemist.

Born in Budapest, Hungary, he received his Bachelor of Science in 1943 and Ph.D. in chemistry in 1946 from the University of Szeged. In 1949, he received his second doctorate, a D.Sc., from the Sorbonne.

In 1954, he emigrated to Canada for a National Research Council of Canada postdoctoral fellow at the Université de Montréal. From 1954 to 1956, he was an assistant professor at Université de Montréal. From 1956 to 1959, he was an associate professor at Université de Montréal. In 1959, he became a Professor.

He was a member of the International Academy of Quantum Molecular Science.

== Scientific research ==
He pioneered molecular orbital (MO) calculations on σ-bonded polyatomic molecules such as saturated hydrocarbons. He also performed the first MO calculations of the acidity and basicity of aromatic molecules in excited states.

He carried out extensive research in molecular spectroscopy. In infrared spectroscopy he studied molecular vibrations as well as overtone bands in hydrogen-bonded systems, and the effect of hydrogen bonds on vibrational anharmonicity. In electronic spectroscopy he specialized in the far ultraviolet region where he observed a number of molecular Rydberg states.

Some of his spectroscopic studies led to insights into biological processes, including the molecular mechanism of vision and the role of hydrogen bonding in anesthesia.

== Honours ==
- In 1967, he was made a Fellow of the Royal Society of Canada.
- In 1982, he was awarded the Quebec government's Prix Marie-Victorin.
- In 1993, he was made a Member of the Hungarian Academy of Sciences.
- In 1995, he was made an Officer of the Order of Canada.
- In 1995, he was made a Knight of the National Order of Quebec.
