= Werner Kutzelnigg =

Austrian chemist (1933–2019)

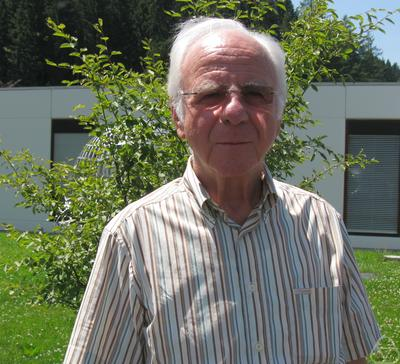
- Born: September 10, 1933; Vienna, Austria
- Died: November 14, 2019 (aged 86); Bochum, Germany

Werner Kutzelnigg (September 10, 1933 – November 24, 2019 in Bochum) was a prominent Austrian-born theoretical chemist and professor in the Chemistry Faculty, Ruhr-Universität Bochum, Germany. Kutzelnigg was born in Vienna. His most significant contributions were in the following fields: relativistic quantum chemistry, coupled cluster methods, theoretical calculation of NMR chemical shifts, explicitly correlated wavefunctions. He was a member of the International Academy of Quantum Molecular Science.

== Life ==
Werner Kutzelnigg studied chemistry in Bonn and Freiburg i. Br. and was awarded his doctorate in 1960 for his experimental work "Untersuchungen zur Zuordnung der Normalschwingungen und Aufklärung der Struktur organischer Ionen". He then turned to theoretical chemistry and became a postdoc with Bernard Pullman and Gaston Berthier in Paris from 1960 to 1963 and with Per-Olov Löwdin at Uppsala University from 1963 to 1964. In 1967 Kutzelnigg habilitated at the University of Göttingen under Werner A. Bingel. From 1970 to 1973 he was professor at the University of Karlsruhe and then full professor at the Chair of Theoretical Chemistry at the Ruhr University Bochum from 1972 until his retirement in 1998.

Kutzelnigg has published papers on various topics in quantum chemistry: methods of treating electron correlation, magnetic properties of molecules (especially chemical shift), relativistic quantum chemistry, theory of chemical bonding and theory of intermolecular forces.

Kutzelnigg also became known for his standard work Einführung in die theoretische Chemie.

== Awards ==
- Carl-Duisberg-Gedächtnispreis (1971)
- Schrödinger Medal of the World Association of Theoretical and Computational Chemists (1995)
- Liebig-Denkmünze of the Gesellschaft Deutscher Chemiker (1996)
- Erich-Hückel-Preis of the Gesellschaft Deutscher Chemiker (2016)
- Member of the International Academy of Quantum Molecular Science
