= International Congress of Quantum Chemistry =

Conference held every 3 years

The International Congress of Quantum Chemistry (ICQC), is an international conference dedicated to the field of quantum chemistry. It is organized by the International Academy of Quantum Molecular Science. The first conference was held from July 4 to 10, 1973 in Menton, France. The first conference marked the "50th anniversary of the discovery of wave mechanics".

== Past meetings ==
In chronological order:

1. Menton, France July 4–10, 1973
2. New Orleans (1976)
3. Kyoto (1979)
4. Uppsala (1982)
5. Montreal (1985)
6. Jerusalem (1988)
7. Menton (1991)
8. Prague (1994)
9. Atlanta (1997)
10. Menton (2000)
11. Bonn (2003)
12. Kyoto (2006)
13. Helsinki (2009)
14. Boulder (2012)
15. Beijing (2015)
16. Menton June 18–23 (2018)
17. Bratislava (2023)
18. Berkeley, California (2026)

Papers from the Congresses have been published by the International Journal of Quantum Chemistry (IJQC).
