= Nicholas C. Handy =

British chemist (1941-2012)

Nicholas Handy
- Born: Nicholas Charles Handy; 17 June 1941
- Died: 2 October 2012 (aged 71)
- Awards: FRS (1990); Leverhulme Medal (2002)
- Scientific career
- Fields: Quantum Chemistry
- Institutions: University of Cambridge; Johns Hopkins University
- Doctoral advisor: Samuel Francis Boys
- Doctoral students: Michael Bearpark; David Clary; Robert J. Harrison; Julia Rice
- Website: iaqms.org/deceased/handy.php

Nicholas Charles Handy FRS (17 June 1941 – 2 October 2012) was a British theoretical chemist. He retired as Professor of quantum chemistry at the University of Cambridge in September 2004.

== Education and early life ==
Handy was born in Wiltshire, England and educated at Clayesmore School. He studied the Mathematical Tripos at the University of Cambridge and completed his PhD on theoretical chemistry supervised by Samuel Francis Boys.

== Research ==
Handy wrote 320 scientific papers published in physical and theoretical chemistry journals. Handy developed several methods in quantum chemistry and theoretical spectroscopy. His contributions have helped greatly to the understanding of:

- the transcorrelated method
- the long range behaviour of Hartree–Fock orbitals
- semiclassical methods for vibrational energies
- the variational method for rovibrational wave-functions (in normal mode and internal coordinates)
- Full configuration interaction with Slater determinants (benchmark studies)
- convergence of the Møller–Plesset series
- the reaction path Hamiltonian
- Anharmonic spectroscopic and thermodynamic properties using higher derivative methods
- Brueckner-doubles theory
- Open shell Møller–Plesset theory
- frequency-dependent properties
- Density functional theory : quadrature, new functionals and molecular properties.

=== Awards and honours ===
Handy was elected a Fellow of the Royal Society (FRS) in 1990. He was awarded the Leverhulme Medal in 2002 and was a member of the International Academy of Quantum Molecular Science.

== Death ==
On 2 October 2012 Nicholas died after a brief battle with pancreatic cancer.
