= Enrico Clementi =

Italian chemist (1931–2021)

- Born: November 19, 1931; Cembra, Italy
- Died: March 30, 2021 (aged 89); Como, Italy
- Education: University of Pavia
- Scientific career
- Workplaces: IBM; Université Louis Pasteur
- Thesis: Spettroscopia dei centri di colore in cristalli alogenuro-alcalini (1954)
- Doctoral advisor: Luigi Giulotto
- Other academic advisors: Giulio Natta

Enrico Clementi (19 November 1931 – 30 March 2021) was an Italian chemist, a pioneer in computational techniques for quantum chemistry and molecular dynamics.

== Education and career ==
Clementi received his Ph.D. in Chemistry from University of Pavia, where he was a student in the Collegio Cairoli, in 1954. His supervisors were Luigi Giulotto and Gianfranco Chiarotti. His doctoral research was conducted at the Department of Physics at Pavia, focusing on experimental studies of the spectroscopy of color centers in alkali halides. He went on to conduct research with Nobel laureate Giulio Natta at Polytechnic University of Milan, Michael Kasha at Florida State University, Kenneth Pitzer at University of California, Berkeley, Robert Mulliken at the University of Chicago.

In 1961, Clementi joined IBM Research. There, he was first responsible for atomic calculations, then manager of a scientific computation department until 1974. As an IBM Fellow (elected 1969), he led research and development in parallel computer architecture and fundamental research in chemistry, biophysics and fluid dynamics. In 1991, he retired from IBM to join Université Louis Pasteur in Strasbourg, France, as Professor of Chemistry from 1992 until 2000.

== Honors and awards ==
Clementi's work has been recognised by awards and honours: IBM Fellow (1969), Fellow of the American Physical Society (1984), President of the International Society of Quantum Biology, Alexander von Humboldt award (2001), Member of the International Academy of Quantum Molecular Science.

== Selected publications ==
- E. Clementi, "Tables of Atomic Functions", IBM Journal of Research and Development, Special Supplement, Vol. 9, No. 1, 1965 doi:10.1147/JRD.1965.5392159
- Clementi, E. (1965). "Ab Initio Computations in Atoms and Molecules". IBM Journal of Research and Development. 9 (1): 2–19. doi:10.1147/rd.91.0002.
- E. Clementi, C. Roetti, of "Tables of Roothaan-Hartree-Fock Wavefunctions", Special Issue in Atomic Data and Nuclear Data Table, Academic Press, New York, 1974 doi:10.1016/S0092-640X(74)80016-1
- Clementi, E.; Logan, D.; Saarinen, J. (1988). "lCAP 3090: Parallel processing for large-scale scientific and engineering problems". IBM Systems Journal. 27 (4): 475–509. doi:10.1147/sj.274.0475. S2CID 17604715.

== Books ==
- Enrico Clementi: "Tables of atomic functions", International Business Machines Corp (1965).
- Enrico Clementi, Carla Roetti:"Atomic Data and Nuclear Data Tables", Academic Press, 1st ed.(1974).
- Enrico Clementi: "Roothaan-Hartree-Fock atomic wavefunctions: Basic functions and their coefficients for ground and certain excited states of neutral and ionized atoms, Z<54", Academic Press (1974).
- Enrico Clementi:"Determination of Liquid Water Structure: Coordination Numbers for Ions and Solvation for biological Molecules",(Lecture Notes in Chemistry 2), Springer-Verlag,ISBN 978-0387078700 (1976).
- Enrico Clementi: "Computational Aspects for Large Chemical Systems", Lecture Notes in Chemistry No.19, Springer-Verlag(1980).
- Enrico Clementi (Ed.), Ramaswamy H. Sarma (Ed.):"Structure and Dynamics: Nucleic Acids and Proteins; Lajolla Symposium Proce Edings, 1982", Proceedings of International Symposium on Structure and Dynamics of Nucleic Acids and Protei", Adenine Pr,ISBN 978-0940030046 (1983).
- Enrico Clementi: "Biological and Artificial Intelligence Systems", Springer; 1st ed., ISBN 978-9072199027 (Sep. 30th, 1988).
- E. Clementi (Ed.): "Modern Techniques in Computational Chemistry: MOTECC-89", Springer, ISBN 978-9072199058 (1989).
- E. Clementi (Ed.): "Modern Techniques in Computational Chemistry: MOTECC-90", Springer,ISBN 978-9072199072 (1990).
- E. Clementi (Ed.): "Modern Techniques in Computational Chemistry: MOTECC-91", Springer, ISBN 978-9072199102 (1991).
- Enrico Clementi (Ed.):"Methods and Techniques in Computational Chemistry: METECC-94, Volume C: Structure and Dynamics", STEF, ISBN 978-8886327015 (1993).
- Enrico Clementi (Ed.), Giorgina Corongiu (Ed.):"Methods and Techniques in Computational Chemistry: METECC-95", STEF, Cagliari, ISBN 978-8886327022 (1995).
- Jean-Marie Andre, David H. Mosley, Marie-Claude Andre, Benoit Champagne, Enrico Clementi, Joseph G. Fripiat, Laurence Leherte, Lorenzo Pisani, Daniel P. Vercauteren, Marjan Vracko :"Exploring Aspects of Computational Chemistry", (in French), Presses Universitaires De Namur, ISBN 978-2870372494 (1997).
- Enrico Clementi (Ed.), Jean-Marie André (Ed.), J. Andrew McCammon (Ed.):"Theory and Applications in Computational Chemistry: The First Decade of the Second Millennium:: International Congress TACC-2012 (AIP Conference Proceedings)", American Institute of Physics, ISBN 978-0735410572, (Aug. 29th, 2012).
