= Klaus Ruedenberg =

German-born American chemist

- Born: Klaus Rüdenberg; August 25, 1920 (age 106); Bielefeld, Germany
- Education: University of Fribourg; University of Zurich
- Occupation: Chemist
- Spouse: Veronika Kutter (m. 1948; died. 2004)

Klaus Rüdenberg (born August 25, 1920) is a German-born American chemist.

== Life and career ==
Ruedenberg was born in Bielefeld, the son of Otto Rüdenberg and Meta Sophie Wertheimer. His father was Jewish. He attended the University of Fribourg, earning his MS degree in chemistry and mathematics. He also attended the University of Zurich, earning his PhD degree in theoretical physics. After earning his degrees, he worked as a research associate with Robert S. Mulliken at the University of Chicago from 1950 to 1955.

Ruedenberg served as a professor in the department of the Johns Hopkins University from 1962 to 1964. During his years as a professor, in 1962, Ruedenberg was named a fellow of the American Physical Society, After his professorship at Hopkins, he served as a professor in the same department at Iowa State University from 1964 to 1991. During his years as a professor, in 1978, he was named a distinguished professor, and in 1980, he was named a fellow of the American Association for the Advancement of Science.

In 2005, Ruedenberg was named an honorary member of the International Academy of Mathematical Chemistry.

== Personal life ==
In 1948, Ruedenberg married Veronika Kutter. Their marriage lasted until her death in 2004.

On August 25, 2020, Ruedenberg turned 100.
