= Faraday Medal (electrochemistry) =

Award of the Royal Society of Chemistry

The Faraday Medal is awarded by the Electrochemistry Group of the Royal Society of Chemistry. Since 1977, it honours distinguished mid-career electrochemists working outside of the United Kingdom and Ireland for their research advancements.

== Laureates ==
Source: RIC

- 1977 Veniamin Grigorievich Levich (1917–1987)
- 1981 John O’M. Bockris
- 1983 Jean-Michel Savéant
- 1985 Michel Armand
- 1987 Heinz Gerischer (1919–1994)
- 1991 David A. J. Rand, CSIRO Division of Mineral Chemistry, Port Melbourne
- 1994 Stanley Bruckenstein, University at Buffalo
- 1995 Michael J. Weaver (1947–2002), Purdue University
- 1996 Adam Heller, University of Texas
- 1998 Wolf Vielstich, Universität Bonn
- 1999 Philippe Allongue, CNRS
- 2000 Alan Maxwell Bond (b. 1946), Monash University
- 2001 Michael Grätzel, École polytechnique fédérale de Lausanne
- 2002 Henry S. White (scientist), University of Utah
- 2003 Dieter M. Kolb (1942–2011), Universität Ulm
- 2004 Daniel A. Scherson, Case Western Reserve University
- 2005 Robert Mark Wightman, University of North Carolina
- 2006 Hubert H. Girault, École polytechnique fédérale de Lausanne
- 2007 Christian Amatore, CNRS
- 2008 Nathan Lewis, California Institute of Technology
- 2009 Reginald M. Penner, University of California, Irvine
- 2011 Héctor D. Abruña, Cornell University
- 2012 Zhong-Qun Tian, Xiamen University
- 2013 Nenad Markovic (scientist)
- 2014 Masatoshi Osawa, Hokkaido University
- 2015 Richard M. Crooks, University of Texas at Austin
- 2016 Justin Gooding, University of New South Wales, Australia
- 2017 Marc Koper, Leiden University
- 2018 Yang Shao-Horn, MIT
- 2019 Martin Winter, Westfälische Wilhelms-Universität Münster
- 2020 Shirley Meng, University of California, San Diego
- 2021 Peter Strasser, Technische Universität Berlin
- 2022 Beatriz Roldán Cuenya, Fritz-Haber-Institute, Berlin
- 2023 Yitao Long, Nanjing University
- 2024 Bilge Yildiz, Massachusetts Institute of Technology

== See also ==
- List of chemistry awards
