= Jörg Behler =

German chemist

Jörg Behler, Ph.D. (2004), Dr. habil. (2014), is a German chemist, who is active in the field of theoretical chemistry; he is a professor of the Ruhr University Bochum since November 2022.

== Education ==
Jörg Behler earned his bachelor's degree in chemistry from 1995 to 2000 at University of Dortmund. He then completed his PhD with Karsten Reuter and Matthias Scheffler at the Fritz Haber Institute of the Max Planck Society with a thesis entitled "Dissociation of Oxygen Molecules on the Al(111) Surface". He went on to a postdoc at ETH Zurich with Michele Parrinello, before being hired at Ruhr University Bochum as a research associate, then head of a junior research group. In 2017, Behler moved to the University of Göttingen as a Full Professor of Theoretical Chemistry. In November 2022 he returned to Ruhr University Bochum.

== Awards ==
- Otto Hahn Medal – Max-Planck-Society (2005);
- Hans G. A. Hellmann Award – Arbeitsgemeinschaft für Theoretische Chemie (2013).

== See also ==
- Stefan Grimme
- Roman M. Balabin
- Martin A. Suhm
