= Vincenzo Barone =

Italian chemist (born 1952)

- Born: 8 November 1952; Ancona, Italy
- Scientific career
- Fields: Theoretical and computational chemistry
- Institutions: University of Naples, Scuola Normale Superiore di Pisa

Vincenzo Barone (b. 8 November 1952, Ancona) is an Italian chemist, active in the field of theoretical and computational chemistry.

He became full professor of physical chemistry at the University of Naples in 1994, and professor of theoretical and computational chemistry at the Scuola Normale Superiore di Pisa in 2009.

He was elected director of the Scuola Normale in 2016 but resigned in 2019 after a clash with the body of professors that would have resulted in a no confidence vote.

He has been chairperson of the Italian Chemical Society (SCI) from 2011 to 2013 and is also a member of the International Academy of Quantum Molecular Science (IAQMS), the European Academy of Sciences, and a fellow of the Royal Society of Chemistry (RSC).

== See also ==
- Martin Suhm
- Stefan Grimme

== Literature ==
- Alex Saragosa: La chimica cambia la sua formula // Il Venerdì di Repubblica, 25 March 2011.
