= Betar Gallant =

American engineer and academic

- Born: Betar Maurkah Gallant
- Education: Massachusetts Institute of Technology
- Awards: National Science Foundation CAREER Award (2021)
- Scientific career
- Fields: Batteries; Li batteries CO₂ conversion
- Workplaces: Massachusetts Institute of Technology; California Institute of Technology
- Thesis: Layer-by-layer assembled carbon nanotube nanostructures for high-power and high-energy lithium storage (2010)
- Doctoral advisor: Yang Shao-Horn
- Website: gallant.mit.edu

Betar Maurkah Gallant is an American engineer who is an associate professor at Massachusetts Institute of Technology. Her research investigates the development of new materials for batteries.

== Early life and education ==
Gallant grew up in a scientific family: her mother worked in urban planning and her father worked in engineering. While she was a teenager, Gallant's father died from an illness and she started to read his old physics textbooks. Gallant was an undergraduate at Massachusetts Institute of Technology, and took part in a Undergraduate Research Opportunities Program with Yang Shao-Horn. Together they explored electrochemistry. During 2009, Gallant joined the United States Department of Energy Energy Technology Program, where she led the Regaining our Energy Science and Engineering Edge initiative. RE-ENERGYSE was developed by the Obama White House to educate young Americans in clean energy research. Gallant completed her doctoral research at Massachusetts Institute of Technology, where she developed carbon nanotube structures for lithium batteries supervised by Shao-Horn.

== Research and career ==
Gallant moved to California Institute of Technology, where she worked as a Kavli Nanoscience Fellow. She was appointed to the faculty at MIT in 2015. She initially investigated the incorporation of carbon dioxide into batteries as a strategy to mitigate greenhouse gases. This research led her to investigate the electrochemical reactions of carbon dioxide, and propose new strategies to simplify carbon capture. She pioneered the use of electrochemical strategies to separate carbon dioxide from amine, the sorbent molecule used in carbon capture and storage. She showed that by separating the carbon dioxide and the amine, it was possible to extend the reaction, eventually making a stable solid form of carbon dioxide that was easy to separate. Gallant has studied the mechanisms that underpin the solid electrolyte interphase (SEI).

Despite non-rechargeable batteries being critical in medical devices like pacemakers, so far, innovation in battery research has mainly considered rechargeable batteries. Gallant decided to address this research gap, developing long-lasting non-rechargeable batteries based on fluorinated electrolytes.

=== Awards and honors ===
- 2016 MIT Bose Research Fellow
- 2019 Army Research Office Young Investigator
- 2019 Ruth and Joel Spira Award for Distinguished Teaching
- 2019 Scialog Fellow Advanced Energy Storage Fellow
- 2020 Scialog Fellow Negative Emissions Science Fellow
- 2021 National Science Foundation CAREER Award
- 2021 ECS Battery Division Early Career Award
- 2022 ECS Toyota Young Investigator Fellowship

=== Selected publications ===
- Lee, Seung-u; Naoaki Yabuuchi; Betar M Gallant; Shuo Chen; Byeong-Su Kim; Hammond, Paula Therese; Yang Shao-Horn (2010). "High-power lithium batteries from functionalized carbon-nanotube electrodes". Nature Nanotechnology. 5 (7): 531–537. Bibcode:2010NatNa...5..531L. doi:10.1038/nnano.2010.116. PMID 20562872. S2CID 1707119. Wikidata Q54309227.
- Robert R. Mitchell; Betar M. Gallant; Carl V. Thompson; Yang Shao-Horn (2011). "All-carbon-nanofiber electrodes for high-energy rechargeable Li–O2 batteries". Energy & Environmental Science. 4 (8): 2952. doi:10.1039/c1ee01496j. S2CID 96799565. Wikidata Q55983091.
- Betar M. Gallant; David G. Kwabi; Robert R. Mitchell; Jigang Zhou; Carl V. Thompson; Yang Shao-Horn (2013). "Influence of Li2O2 morphology on oxygen reduction and evolution kinetics in Li–O2 batteries". Energy & Environmental Science. 6 (8): 2518. doi:10.1039/c3ee40998h. S2CID 94358456. Wikidata Q60014990.
