= Suhm =

Suhm is a surname. Notable people with the surname include:

- Martin Suhm (born 1962), German chemist and spectroscopist
- Peter Frederik Suhm (1728–1798), Danish historian
- Rudolf von Willemoes-Suhm (1847–1875), German naturalist

== See also ==
- Suh (surname)
- SUHM
