= Peter Strasser (chemist) =

German chemist

- Education: Fritz Haber Institute (1999, PhD); University of Tübingen (1995, Diplom)
- Known for: Electrocatalysis; Surface chemistry
- Awards: Member of the Academia Europaea (2023); Faraday Medal (2021); Otto Hahn Medal (2000)
- Scientific career
- Fields: Chemistry
- Workplaces: Technische Universität Berlin
- Doctoral advisor: Gerhard Ertl

Peter Strasser (born in Heilbronn) is a German chemist. He is the winner of the 2021 Faraday Medal.

== Career ==
Strasser studied chemistry at the University of Tübingen, at Stanford University (John Ross), and at the University of Pisa and obtained his Diplom in Physical Chemistry in 1995. He conducted his doctoral research under the direction of Gerhard Ertl and obtained his PhD in Physical Chemistry and Electrochemistry from the Fritz Haber Institute of the Max Planck Society in 1999. He joined Symyx Technologies, Silicon Valley as a postdoctoral associate and was later promoted to Senior Member of staff and served as project leader in Electrocatalysis and Heterogeneous Catalysis. In 2004 he became assistant professor at the Department of Chemical and Biomolecular Engineering at the University of Houston. Since 2007 he has been the chaired professor of Electrochemistry and Electrocatalysis in the Chemical Engineering Division at Technische Universität Berlin. Since 2018 he is a visiting professor at the Department of Material Science at Tongji University.

The focus of his research group is on the investigation of atomic / molecular relationships in the structure, composition and surface catalytic reactivity of catalysts for gas-phase catalytic and electrocatalytic processes. Material-chemical issues are researched, which form the basis for electrochemical energy storage and conversion processes. These are used, for example, in regenerative energy system components such as fuel cells, batteries, water electrolysers or solar photoelectrochemical reactors to convert CO_{2} into fuels and chemicals.

== Awards ==
Clarivate Highly Cited Researcher in the category Chemistry 2018, 2019, 2020, 2021, and 2022.

- 2023 Carl Wagner Memorial Award, Electrochemical Society (ECS)
- 2023 Member of the Academia Europaea
- 2023 Fellow of the Electrochemical Society (ECS)
- 2022 Fellow of the International Society of Electrochemistry (ISE)
- 2021 Christian-Friedrich-Schönbein Medal of Honor, European Fuel Cell Forum
- 2021 Faraday Medal, Royal Society of Chemistry (RSC)
- 2020 Brian Conway Prize for Physical Electrochemistry, International Society of Electrochemistry (ISE)
- 2018 Sir William Grove Award, The International Society of Hydrogen Energy
- 2018 Nature Publishing Award
- 2016 Ertl-Prize
- 2016 Otto Roelen Medal
- 2000 Otto Hahn Medal
