= Kelsey Stoerzinger =

American chemist

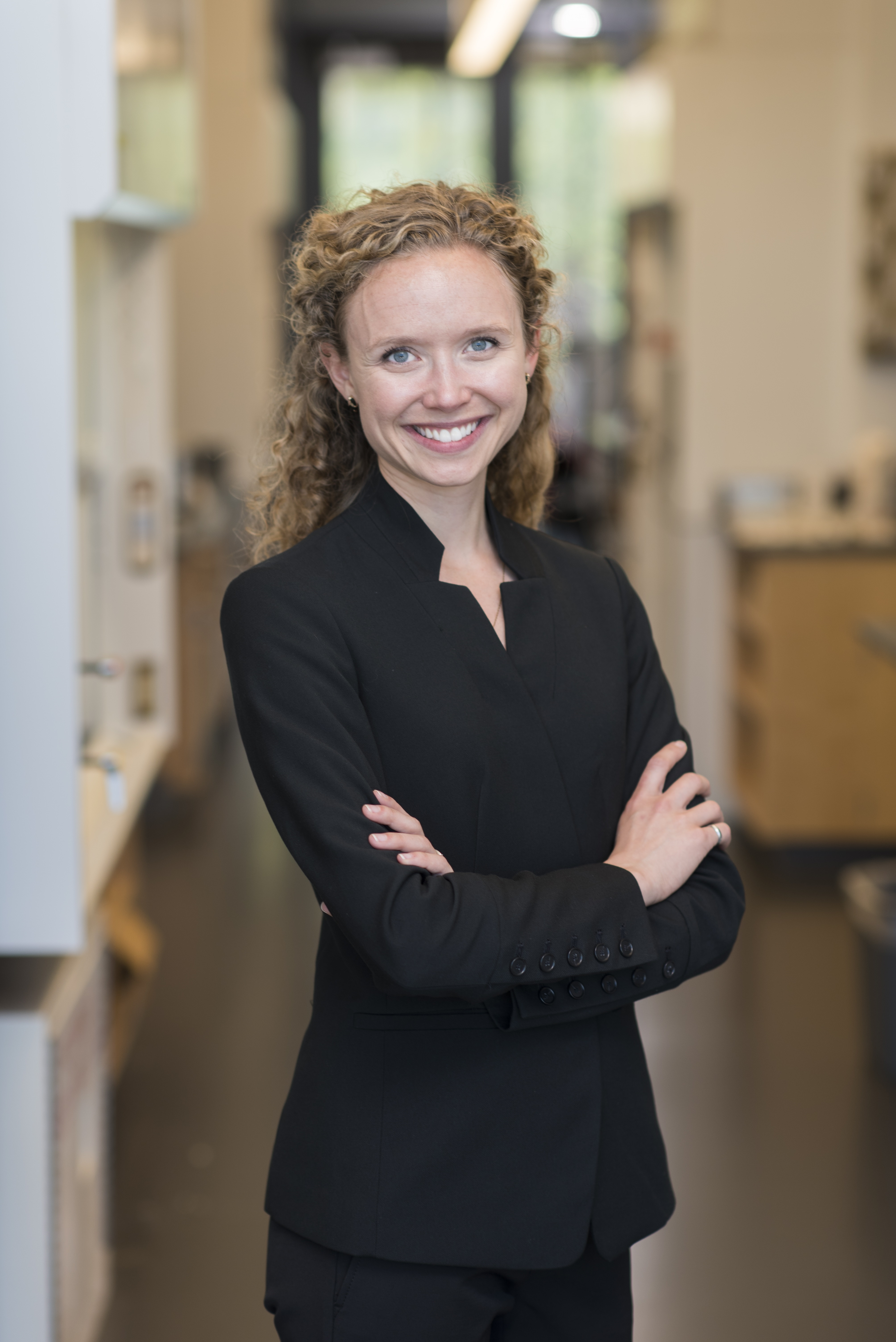
- Stoerzinger at OSU in 2019
- Education: University of Cambridge; Northwestern University; Massachusetts Institute of Technology
- Scientific career
- Workplaces: Oregon State University; University of Minnesota; Pacific Northwest National Laboratory
- Thesis: Understanding the catalytic activity of oxides through their electronic structure and surface chemistry (2016)
- Website: Stoerzinger Research Group

Kelsey Stoerzinger is an American chemist who is an associate professor at the University of Minnesota. Her research considers the design of materials and processes for renewable energy storage. She is interested in the design of sustainable catalysts that make use of earth abundant materials. She was awarded the 2025 American Chemical Society Marks-Ipatieff Prize.

== Early life and education ==
Stoerzinger is from Inver Grove Heights, Minnesota. She attended Eagan High School, where she became "captivated" by the oboe. She was an undergraduate student at Northwestern University, where she was an oboe major, but decided to switch major after seeing so many leading women scientists. She eventually worked in the laboratory of Teri W. Odom, where she developed surface-enhanced Raman spectroscopy. She spent a summer interning at Dow Corning and another at General Motors. During her undergraduate studies, she was awarded a Churchill Scholarship to spend a year at the University of Cambridge, where she worked with a spin echo spectrometer. She moved to Massachusetts Institute of Technology as a graduate student, where she studied the catalytic activity of oxides with Yang Shao-Horn. As a doctoral student, she was recognized by the Materials Research Society for her efforts to identify optimized oxides. Specifically, she looked to understand the relationship between the structure and function of oxides. Stoerzinger joined Pacific Northwest National Laboratory as a postdoctoral fellow, where she studied photo-electrochemical and electrochemical interfaces. In 2018 she became a staff scientist at PNNL.

== Research and career ==
Stoerzinger was an assistant professor at Oregon State University in 2019. She worked on water splitting and the development of chlorine-containing byproducts. She was awarded a United States Department of Energy Early Career Award to design new catalysts for ammonia production. In 2023, Stoerzinger joined the University of Minnesota. Stoerzinger combines X-ray and vibrational spectroscopy to better understand the steady-state and operational properties of electrodes used in electrocatalysis.

== Awards and honors ==
- 2021 National Science Foundation CAREER Award
- 2021 Intel Rising Star Award
- 2022 International Society of Electrochemistry Electrochemical Materials Science Award
- 2022 Materials Research Society Nelson "Buck" Robinson Science and Technology Award
- 2022 Electrochemical Society Energy Technology Division Supramaniam Srinivasan Young Investigator Award
- 2025 American Chemical Society Marks-Ipatieff Prize

== Selected publications ==
- Theresa Sperger; Italo A Sanhueza; Indrek Kalvet; Franziska Schoenebeck (24 July 2015). "Computational Studies of Synthetically Relevant Homogeneous Organometallic Catalysis Involving Ni, Pd, Ir, and Rh: An Overview of Commonly Employed DFT Methods and Mechanistic Insights". Chemical Reviews. 115 (17): 9532–9586. doi:10.1021/acs.chemrev.5b00163. ISSN 0009-2665. PMID 26207572. Wikidata Q60240345.
- Franziska Schoenebeck; K N Houk (1 March 2010). "Ligand-controlled regioselectivity in palladium-catalyzed cross coupling reactions". Journal of the American Chemical Society. 132 (8): 2496–2497. doi:10.1021/ja9077528. ISSN 0002-7863. PMID 20121156. Wikidata Q43178644.
- Franziska Schoenebeck; Daniel H Ess; Gavin O Jones; K N Houk (1 June 2009). "Reactivity and regioselectivity in 1,3-dipolar cycloadditions of azides to strained alkynes and alkenes: a computational study". Journal of the American Chemical Society. 131 (23): 8121–8133. doi:10.1021/ja9003624. ISSN 0002-7863. PMID 19459632. Wikidata Q34982330.
