= Hosemann =

Hosemann is a surname. Notable people with the surname include:

- Delbert Hosemann (born 1947), American politician
- Marc Hosemann (born 1970), German actor
- Rolf Hosemann (1912–1994), German physicist
- Theodor Hosemann (1807–1875), German genre painter, draftsman, illustrator, and caricaturist
