= Matthias Heinemann =

Professor of molecular systems biology (b. 1972)

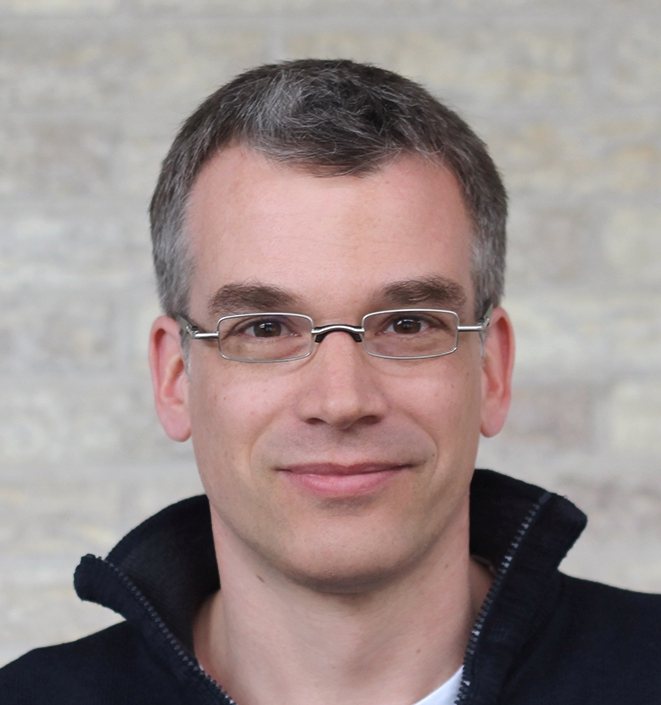
- Born: July 1, 1972 (age 54)
- Education: RWTH Aachen University (PhD)
- Awards: DuPont Young Professor Award (2011) VIDI Award (2011) Kent University – Award for Science and Business (2018) VICI Award (2020)
- Scientific career
- Workplaces: University of Groningen ETH Zurich RWTH Aachen University
- Thesis: Experimental analysis, modeling and dynamic simulation of thermodynamic and kinetic phenomena in gel-stabilized enzyme carriers. (2003)
- Website: https://heinemannlab.eu/ https://www.rug.nl/research/molecular-systems-biology/ https://twitter.com/HeinemannLab

Matthias Heinemann (born July 1, 1972) is a professor of molecular systems biology at the University of Groningen. Heinemann leads an interdisciplinary lab of approximately 12 graduate students and post-doctoral scholars. Until 2019, he served as the chairman of the Groningen Biomolecular Sciences and Biotechnology Institute, was a board member of the Dutch Origins Center and the coordinator of EU ITN project MetaRNA. Heinemann is a member of the Faculty of 1000.

== Education ==
Heinemann received his degree (Dipl.-Ing.) in environmental engineering from the University of Stuttgart. In 2003, he obtained a Ph.D. in biochemical engineering (summa cum laude) from the RWTH Aachen University, after which he joined the Bioprocess lab of ETH Zurich as a postdoc. In 2006, he joined the Institute of Molecular Systems Biology of ETH Zurich as a group leader in the research unit of Uwe Sauer. In 2010, he moved to the University of Groningen as an associate professor, where he got promoted to full professor in 2013.

== Research ==
Heinemann's research field is systems biology of microbial metabolism. Together with his lab members, he has made the following major contributions to the fundamental understanding of metabolism:

- found that cells can measure intracellular flux – the rate of metabolic activity – and use this information to regulate other metabolic fluxes,
- demonstrated that the intracellular flux state evolves as a trade-off between two principles – optimality under a given environmental condition and minimal adjustment to alternative conditions,
- showed that flux-sensing can lead to bistability in metabolism and to antibiotic tolerant persisters, as well as it has relevance for aging in yeast,
- discovered that the metabolism of yeast is an autonomous oscillator, together with the cell cycle machinery acting in a system of coupled oscillators, with the metabolic dynamics being due to the fact that biosynthetic processes are partially temporally segregated during the cell cycle,
- found that an upper limit in Gibbs energy dissipation rate governs cellular metabolism.

His lab developed new technologies and resources for metabolic studies on the single cell level and proteomics:

- developed the first method for single-cell metabolomics with Renato Zenobi (ETH Zurich) and for single-cell dynamic NAD(P)H measurement,
- designed the first microfluidic device for microscopic monitoring of yeast cells, which allowed to observe yeast over its whole lifespan,
- developed molecular sensors to measure glycolytic flux in single yeast cells,
- generated the reference proteomics dataset for E. coli by quantifying the levels of expressed proteins over a wide range of growth conditions.

Overall, Heinemann has authored or co-authored about 90 peer-reviewed scientific articles.
