= Martin Winter =

Martin Winter may refer to:

- Martin Winter (mayor) (born 1962), mayor of Doncaster, England
- Martin Winter (rower) (1955–1988), German rower
- Martin Winter (chemist) (born 1965), German chemist and materials scientist
