= Wolf Vielstich =

German chemist

- Education: University of Göttingen (PhD); University of Göttingen (Diplom)
- Known for: Electrochemistry
- Awards: Faraday Medal (1998)
- Scientific career
- Fields: Chemistry
- Workplaces: University of Bonn
- Doctoral advisor: Heinz Gerischer

Wolf Vielstich (born 18 June 1923 in Munich; died 27 August 2021) was a German chemist and professor at the University of Bonn from 1965 to 1988. His research focus included batteries and fuel cells.

== Early life ==
He worked as a graduate student with Heinz Gerischer as his thesis advisor, did a postdoc at Louisiana State University with Paul Delahay and moved to the University of Bonn in 1958. He completed his habilitation in 1965 with a book on fuel cells, after which he was appointed professor in Bonn. In 1972 he was appointed director of the institute, he retired in 1998 from the University of Bonn.

In 1998, he received the Faraday Medal from the Royal Society of Chemistry.
