= Sigrid D. Peyerimhoff =

German chemist (born 1937)

- Education: University of Gießen
- Awards: 1977 Medal of the International Academy of Quantum Molecular Science 1988 Gottfried Wilhelm Leibniz-Prize 1994 Cross of Merit of the Federal Republic of Germany 2007 Cothenius-Medaille of the Academy of Sciences Leopoldina 2008 Grand Cross of Merit of the Federal Republic of Germany 2011 Honorary doctor of the University of Ulm
- Scientific career
- Institutions: University of Gießen, University of Chicago, University of Washington, Princeton University, University of Mainz, University of Bonn
- Doctoral advisor: Bernhard Kockel
- Doctoral students: Christel Marian, Stefan Grimme, Matthias Ernzerhof

Sigrid Doris Peyerimhoff (born 12 January 1937, in Rottweil) is a theoretical chemist and Emeritus Professor at the Institute of Physical and Theoretical Chemistry, University of Bonn, Germany.

== Education ==
After completing her abitur, Peyerimhoff studied physics at the University of Gießen, completing her degree in 1961 and receiving her doctorate under supervision of Bernhard Kockel in 1963. After researching at the University of Chicago, the University of Washington, and Princeton University, she returned to Germany and gained her habilitation at the University of Gießen in 1967. She became professor for theoretical chemistry at the University of Mainz in 1970, and at the University of Bonn in 1972.

== Quantum chemistry ==
Her contributions have been to the development of ab initio quantum chemical methods, in particular, multireference configuration interaction, and to their application in many fields of physics and chemistry. Particular emphasis has been given to electronically excited states, molecular spectra and photochemistry. Many studies are on atmospheric molecules and ions, their lifetimes in excited states and decomposition due to radiative and non-radiative processes, and on stability and spectra of clusters.

Some of her students became well known for their contribution to quantum chemistry, including Bernd Engels, Stefan Grimme, Bernd A. Hess, Christel Marian, Matthias Ernzerhoff and Bernd M. Nestmann.

== Awards and honors ==
During her career, she received several awards and memberships:

- 1977 Medal of the International Academy of Quantum Molecular Science
- 1988 Gottfried Wilhelm Leibniz-Prize
- 1994 Cross of Merit of the Federal Republic of Germany
- 2007 Cothenius Medal of the Academy of Sciences Leopoldina
- 2008 Grand Cross of Merit of the Federal Republic of Germany
- 2011 Honorary doctor of the University of Ulm

She is also a member of the International Academy of Quantum Molecular Science

== Publications ==
She is the author of over 400 original articles in various international journals and coauthor of Umweltstandards: Fakten und Bewertungsprobleme am Beispiel des Strahlenrisikos. Her history of computational chemistry in Germany is of particular note. She edited Interactions in Molecules.

=== Partial bibliography ===
- Peyerimhoff, Sigrid D. Interactions in Molecules: Electronic and Steric Effects. Weinheim: Wiley-VCH, 2003. ISBN 3-527-27732-3
- Peyerimhoff, Sigrid. Ab initio – Ein Leben für die Quantenchemie [Ab initio – a life for quantum chemistry] (in German). Berlin: GNT Publishing, 2025. ISBN 978-3-86225-138-4; e-book: ISBN 978-3-86225-573-3, doi: 10.47261/1573 (autobiography)
