= Martin Quack =

German physical chemist, spectroscopist

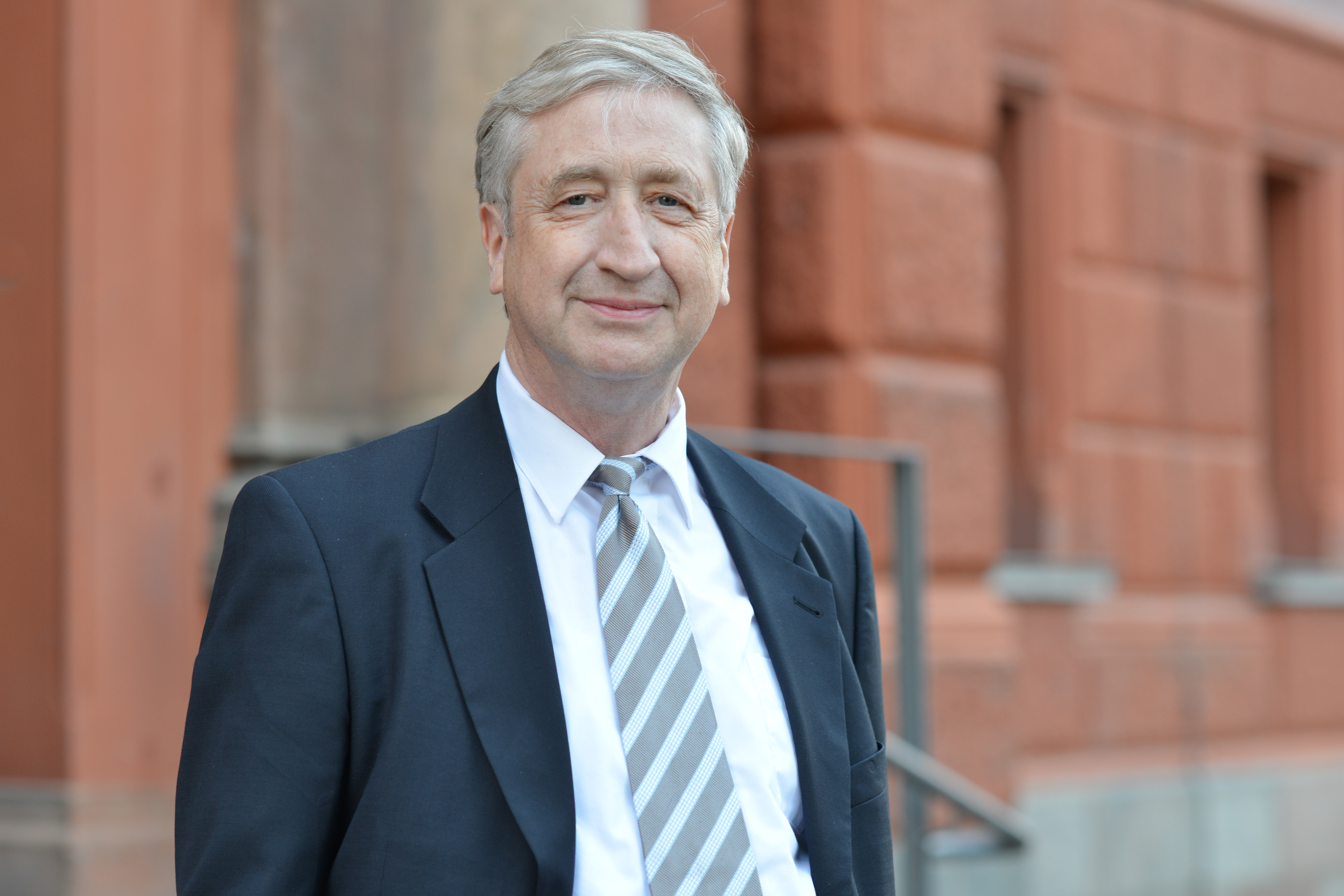
- Martin Quack (2014)
- Born: July 22, 1948; Darmstadt
- Education: Technical University of Darmstadt, University of Grenoble, University of Göttingen, Ecole Polytechnique Fédérale de Lausanne (Dr es sces techn)
- Scientific career
- Fields: physical chemistry, molecular physics, spectroscopy, kinetics
- Workplaces: University of Bonn; ETH Zurich

Martin Quack (born 22 July 1948) is a German physical chemist and spectroscopist; he is a professor at ETH Zürich.

== Life and work ==
Martin Quack started his chemistry studies at the Technical University of Darmstadt in 1966 and continued as fellow of the German Academic Exchange Service (DAAD) between 1969 and 1970 at the University of Grenoble and then he obtained his diploma as chemist in 1971 at the University of Göttingen. In 1972 he moved to the École polytechnique fédérale de Lausanne, where he obtained his doctoral degree in 1975 working with Jürgen Troe on the statistical theory of unimolecular and complex forming bimolecular reactions. In 1973 he attended a quantum chemistry summer school organized by Per-Olov Löwdin in Uppsala. From 1976 to 1977 he stayed as Max Kade fellow with William H. Miller at UC Berkeley. Subsequently, he moved to Göttingen and finished his habilitation there in 1978. He was appointed full professor at the University of Bonn in 1982. Since 1983 he has been professor of physical chemistry at ETH Zürich, where he served as head of the Laboratory of Physical Chemistry in 1986/1987, 1991/1992 and 2006/2007.

In 2005 he was Miller Visiting Research Professor at the University of California, Berkeley. In 2011 and 2012 he served as President (1. Vorsitzender) of the German Bunsen Society for Physical Chemistry.

His research group investigates (employing high-resolution infrared spectroscopy, multiphoton excitation and time-resolved spectroscopy) the quantum dynamics and kinetics of molecules both theoretically and experimentally, with special emphasis on the dynamics of tunneling and parity violation (due to the electroweak interaction of the Standard Model) in chiral molecules. Most notably their theoretical work has shown that the effect of parity violation is between one and two orders of magnitude larger than anticipated from earlier calculations (as reviewed in) and can be detected, in principle, as an energy difference between the ground states of enantiomers of chiral molecules by precision experiments of molecular physics, using the fundamentally new kinetic process of the time evolution of parity in isolated molecules.) He is an editor (with Frédéric Merkt) of the "Handbook of High Resolution Spectroscopy".

== Awards and honours ==
- 1982 Nernst-Haber-Bodenstein prize of the Bunsen Society for Physical Chemistry
- 1984 Klung (Wilhelmy Weberbank) Award of FU Berlin
- 1987 Bourke Lecturer of Royal Society of Chemistry
- 1988 Hinshelwood Lecturer and Christensen Fellow, Oxford
- 1991 Otto Bayer Award
- 2002 Paracelsus Award, Swiss Chemical Society
- 2006 Erwin Schrödinger Gold Medal, Innsbruck
- 2009 Honorary Doctorate, University of Göttingen
- 2012 August Wilhelm von Hofmann Medal (German Chemical Society, GDCh)
- 2012 QSCP medal of the CMOA (Centre de Mécanique Ondulatoire Appliquée, Paris)

He has been elected as a Fellow of the American Physical Society (1990), Member of the Academy of Sciences Leopoldina (1998), the Berlin-Brandenburg Academy of Sciences and Humanities (1999), the American Academy of Arts and Sciences (2017) as well as a corresponding member of Göttingen Academy of Sciences and Humanities (2014). From 2002 to 2011 he had been member of the National Research Council of the Swiss National Science Foundation. In 2014 he was elected as member of the presidium of the German Academy of Sciences, Leopoldina.

== See also ==
- Richard N. Zare
- Martin A. Suhm
- Roman M. Balabin
- Renato Zenobi
