= Bretislav Friedrich =

American physicist

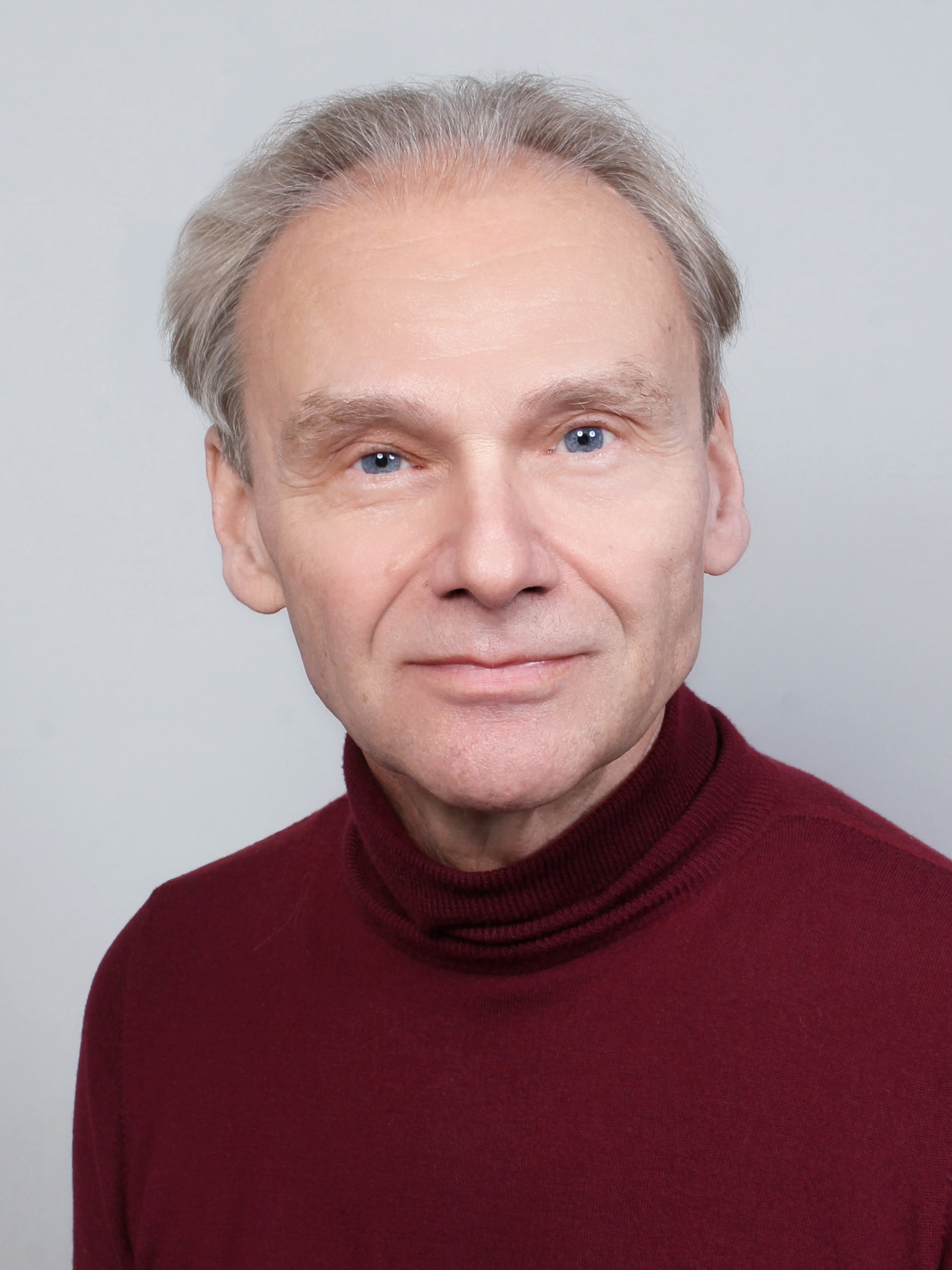
- Born: 29 May 1953 (age 73); Prague, Czech Republic
- Known for: Manipulation of molecules with and in electromagnetic fields Cold Molecules; History of Science
- Scientific career
- Fields: Molecular Physics
- Workplaces: J. Heyrovsky Institute of Physical Chemistry and Electrochemistry; University of Utah; Max-Planck-Institut für Strömungsforschung; Harvard University; Technische Universität Berlin; Fritz Haber Institute of the MPG; Max-Planck-Institut für Wissenschaftsgeschichte
- Doctoral advisor: Vladimir Cermak and Zdenek Herman

Bretislav Friedrich (born 29 May 1953) is a Research Group leader at the Department of Molecular Physics, Fritz-Haber-Institut der Max-Planck-Gesellschaft and Honorarprofessor at the Technische Universität in Berlin, Germany. He is globally recognized for his pioneering research surrounding interaction of molecules with and in electric, magnetic, and optical fields as well as on cold molecules. He was admitted to the Learned Society of the Czech Republic in 2011. In 2025, he was elected member of the Comenius Academic Club.

== Biography ==
Bretislav Friedrich was born in Prague, Czech Republic on 29 May 1953. He graduated, in 1976, in physical chemistry from Charles University in Prague, with a diploma thesis on deviations of dilute macro-molecular solutions in mixed solvents from the ideal behavior. Subsequently, he changed fields to study ion-molecule reactions in the gas phase and earned his Ph.D. degree from the J. Heyrovsky Institute of Physical Chemistry and Electrochemistry of the Czech Academy of Sciences in 1981 for his work on ion scattering in crossed beams.

=== Academic career ===
In 1981-82, he was a postdoc with Jean Futrell at the University of Utah, in Salt Lake City, where he studied vibrational Feshbach resonances in low-energy charge-transfer scattering and other elementary collision process. He then returned to the J. Heyrovsky Institute of Physical Chemistry and Electrochemistry as a research scientist. In 1986-87, he was an Alexander von Humboldt Fellow in the department of Peter Toennies at the Max-Planck-Institut für Strömungsforschung in Göttingen, where he studied inelastic proton scattering by atoms and molecules.

In 1987, Bretislav Friedrich joined Dudley Herschbach's group at Harvard University, at first as a research associate. During the following sixteen years at Harvard, he developed techniques to orient and align gas-phase molecules by exploiting the interactions between their permanent and induced dipole moments and external electric, magnetic, and optical fields. Together with the group of John Doyle at Harvard Physics, he also pioneered the study of cold molecules, by helping to develop the buffer-gas cooling technique and its combination with magnetic trapping. In 1997, he was appointed Senior Research Fellow and Lecturer in Chemistry at Harvard University.

In 2003, he became a Research Group Leader at the Fritz Haber Institute of the Max Planck Society in Berlin, Germany, where he has been based ever since. His current research is chiefly theoretical (with a predilection for an analytic approach), but closely related to ongoing experiments. It revolves around interactions of molecules with and in fields and branches out into areas such as super-symmetric quantum mechanics, quantum computing, and spectroscopy of molecules in helium nano-droplets.

=== Personal life ===
Bretislav Friedrich and his wife, Christine Friedrich, nee Storch, have three children, Juliane (b. 2007), Christian (b. 2008) and Jitka (b. 2010). His daughter Jana (b. 1982), from his marriage with Helena Friedrich (1955–2002), is a graphic-design artist, living in Prague.

=== History of Science ===
Alongside his scientific research, Bretislav Friedrich has maintained an abiding interest in the History of Science and has written on the emergence of quantum mechanics and of physical and theoretical chemistry as well as penned numerous biographical articles.

=== Disarmament ===
In 2015, Bretislav Friedrich co-organized an international symposium to mark the centenary of the infamous chlorine cloud attack at Ypres in 1915. The symposium examined key aspects of chemical warfare from the first research on and deployment of chemical weapons in World War I to the development and use of chemical warfare during the century hence. The focus was on scientific, ethical, legal, and political issues of chemical weapons research and deployment — including the issue of dual use — as well as the ongoing effort to control the possession of chemical weapons and to ultimately achieve their elimination. A proceedings volume consisting of papers presented at the symposium and supplemented by additional articles covers key aspects of chemical warfare from 1915 until this day.

== Literature on Bretislav Friedrich ==
- Kostlán, k vydání připravili Soňa Štrbáňová a Antonín (2011). One hundred Czech Scientists in Exile(Sto českých vědců v exilu) (Vyd. 1. ed.). Praha: Academia. pp. 254–257. ISBN 978-80-200-1915-8.
- Josefovicova, Milena (2011). ""From the Czechoslovak Academy of Sciences into Exile: Bretislav Friedrich" Part I of interview with Milena Josefovicova". History of Science and Technology. 43: 263–286. ISSN 0300-4414.
- Josefovicova, Milena (2011). ""There is only one science" Part II of interview with Milena Josefovicova". History of Science and Technology. 43: 33–49. ISSN 0300-4414.
- "Autobiography of Bretislav Friedrich". Molecular Physics. 111 (12–13): 1632–1642. 1 July 2013. Bibcode:2013MolPh.111.1632.. doi:10.1080/00268976.2013.792466. ISSN 0026-8976. S2CID 59472229.
- Friedrich, Bretislav (6 December 2017). "Bretislav Friedrich - The Exacting Task of Bringing Molecules to Attention". Scientia.global. doi:10.26320/SCIENTIA64.
