= Christel Marian =

German chemist

- Education: University of Cologne, University of Bonn
- Awards: Member of the North Rhine-Westphalian Academy of Sciences, Humanities and the Arts
- Scientific career
- Workplaces: University of Bonn, Stockholm University, University of Düsseldorf
- Doctoral advisor: Sigrid D. Peyerimhoff

Christel Maria Marian (4 June 1954) is a German chemist. She is a full professor and the director of the institute of theoretical and computational chemistry at the University of Düsseldorf.

== Education and professional life ==
Marian studied chemistry in Cologne and Bonn. She finished her doctorate in Theoretical Chemistry at the University of Bonn under the supervision of Sigrid D. Peyerimhoff in 1980. She did a postdoc in the Theoretical Physics Department of Stockholm University (Sweden) in the group of Per E. M. Siegbahn. She completed her habilitation at the University of Bonn in 1991. In 2001, she joined the University of Düsseldorf as a full professor. Between 2011 and 2015, she was Dean of the Mathematical and Natural Science Faculty at the University of Düsseldorf.

== Personal life ==
She has two daughters.

== Research ==
Her research focuses on the development and application of theoretical and computational excited-state electronic structure methods – also for biomolecules. She also worked on spin-orbit coupling in molecules.

== Selected publications ==
Some of her most cited publications are:

- Heß, Bernd A.; Marian, Christel M.; Wahlgren, Ulf; Gropen, Odd (1996-03-29). "A mean-field spin-orbit method applicable to correlated wavefunctions". Chemical Physics Letters. 251 (5): 365–371. Bibcode:1996CPL...251..365H. doi:10.1016/0009-2614(96)00119-4. ISSN 0009-2614.
- Marian, Christel M. (2012). "Spin–orbit coupling and intersystem crossing in molecules". Wiley Interdisciplinary Reviews: Computational Molecular Science. 2 (2): 187–203. doi:10.1002/wcms.83. ISSN 1759-0884. S2CID 97659596.
- Marian, Christel M. (2005). "A new pathway for the rapid decay of electronically excited adenine". J. Chem. Phys. 122 (10): 104314. Bibcode:2005JChPh.122j4314M. doi:10.1063/1.1861452. PMID 15836322.
- Klotz, Rainer; Marian, Christel M.; Peyerimhoff, Sigrid D.; Hess, Bernd A.; Buenker, Robert J. (1984-09-15). "Calculation of spin-forbidden radiative transitions using correlated wavefunctions: Lifetimes of b1Σ+, a1Δ states in O2, S2 and SO". Chemical Physics. 89 (2): 223–236. doi:10.1016/0301-0104(84)85311-2. ISSN 0301-0104.
- Marian, Christel M. (2007-03-01). "The Guanine Tautomer Puzzle: Quantum Chemical Investigation of Ground and Excited States". The Journal of Physical Chemistry A. 111 (8): 1545–1553. Bibcode:2007JPCA..111.1545M. doi:10.1021/jp068620v. ISSN 1089-5639. PMID 17274608.

== Awards ==
She is a member of the North Rhine-Westphalian Academy of Sciences, Humanities and the Arts.
