= Hartmut Kallmann =

German physicist

Harmut Kallmann (5 February 1896 – 11 June 1978) was a German physicist. He is known for his work on the scintillation counter for the detection of gamma rays.

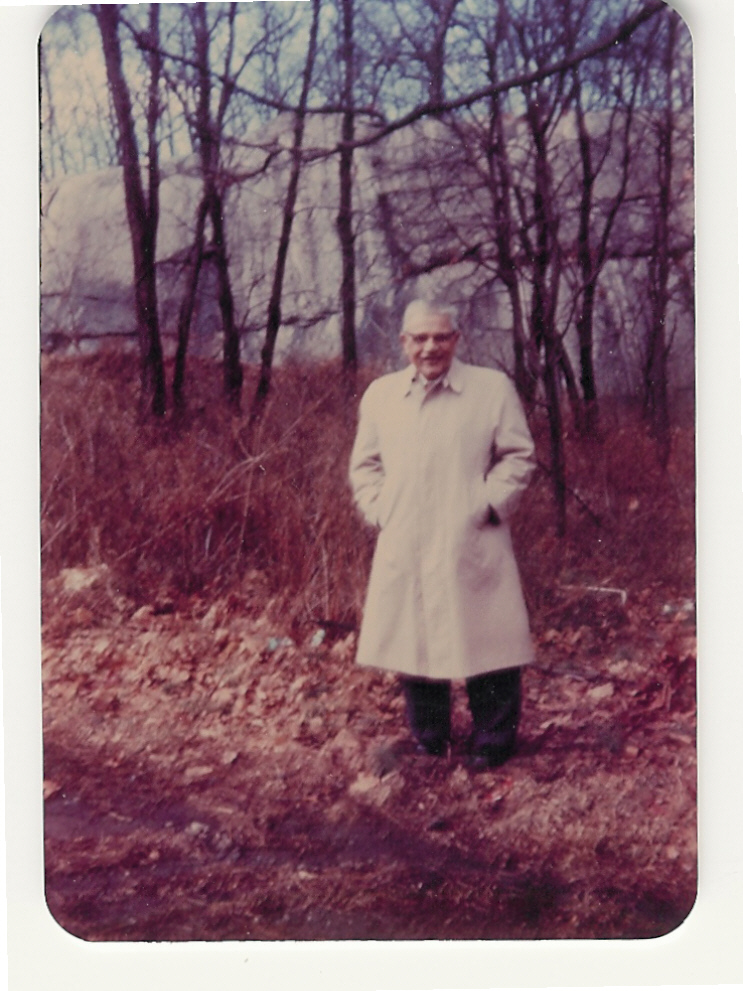
Hartmut Kallmann

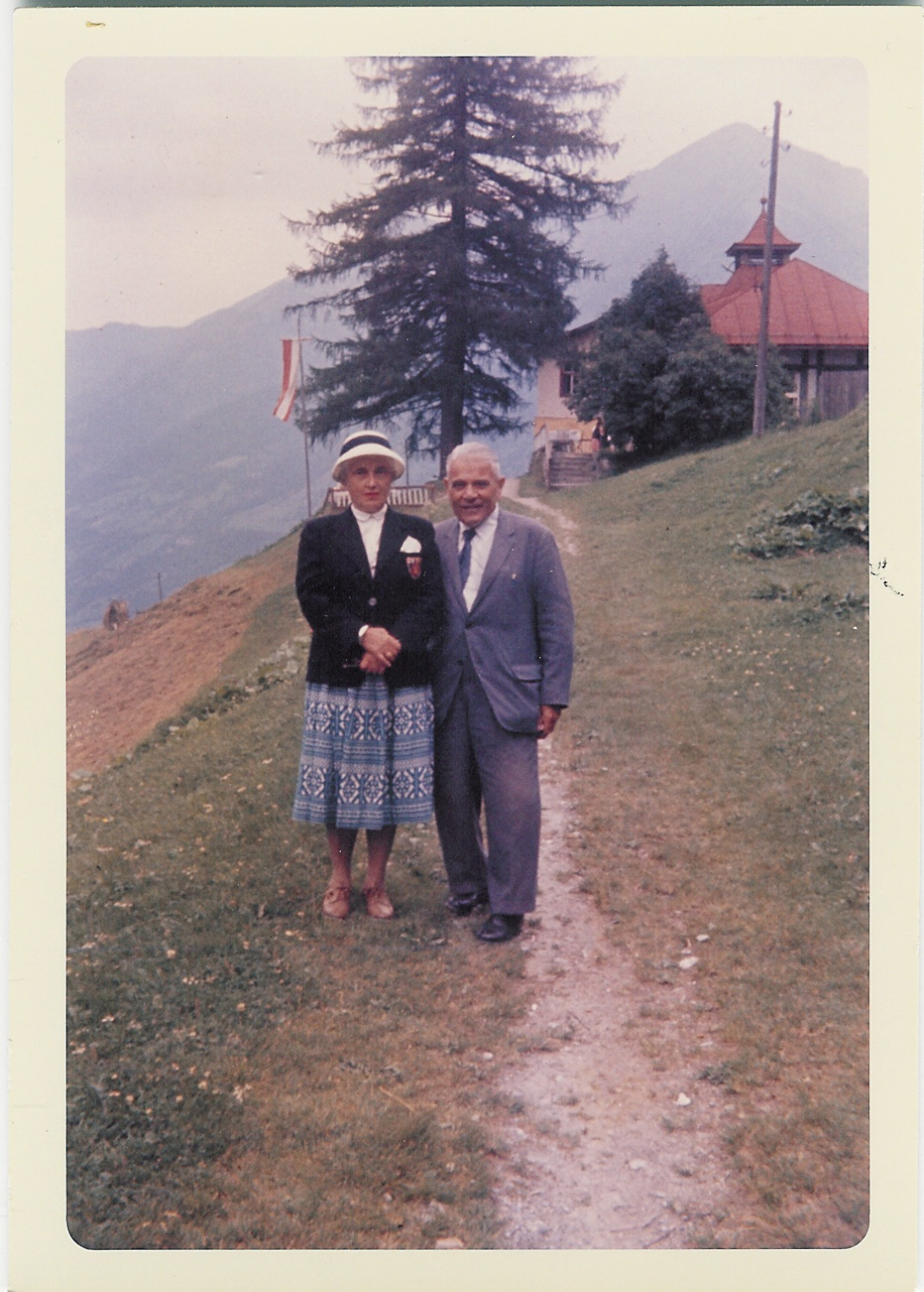
Hartmut and Erika Kallmann

== Biography - Career ==
Kallmann was born in Berlin in a Jewish family. He studied at the University of Göttingen and wrote his dissertation under Max Planck, completing it in 1920. After this he worked at the Kaiser Wilhelm Institute for Physical Chemistry and Electrochemistry. As a post-doctoral researcher he worked with Fritz Haber and Fritz London. In 1933 he was dismissed from the institute due to his non-Aryan Jewish descent. The companies IG Farben and AEG provided him a research lab to continue his work with some restrictions. He requested to leave Germany but was not allowed to.

Kallmann built the world's first organic scintillator in Berlin.

Thermo Electron corporation (now Thermo Fisher Scientific) credited Kallmann and Broser with pioneering modern day scintillation counting by combining a scintillating material with a photomultiplier, as a means of improving light detection and reducing the eye fatigue apparently common to earlier, cruder methods of detection.

In 1948, Kallmann's knowledge about photomultiplier scintillation counters brought him to the United States as a research fellow for the U.S. Army Signal Corps Laboratory in Belmar, New Jersey.

The book, Pions to Quarks: Particle Physics in the 1950s describes Kallmann's contribution to particle physics.

== Biography - In Berlin ==
Kallmann was actively hunted by the Nazi SS during WWII. They would often show up at his large home looking for him, but always came up the front walk, so it was easy for Hartmut and his wife to spot their approach. The inside layout of the house was one where a hallway led from the front, all the way around rejoining the front entrance. When they approached, Hartmut would wait in the hallway at the back of the house, directly opposite from the entrance.

The SS searchers would walk, not just all together, but walked as a single group, in just one direction. Hartmut and his wife Erika had signals worked out, so that Hartmut was able to discern in which direction the SS chose to proceed on any given day. He would then walk in the other. By the time they came to the back of the house, he would be at the front and continue his walk as the SS proceeded around looking for him.

At some point, he was found and taken to a cattle car for transport to a concentration camp. Erika, frantic, used her Catholic connections and found someone who had been a friend of the family and was in the SS himself. He, at great peril to his own well being, managed to sneak Hartmut off the cattle car and to safety. His children were not considered Jewish by the Nazi authorities and were not hunted.

In 1948 he emigrated to the US and established a research lab at New York University. He died in Munich at the age of 82.

== Patents and publications ==
- Patent for Scintillator Solution Enhancers
- The Basic Process Occurring in Liquid Scintillation, as presented by Kallmann and Furst in 1957.

== Bibliography ==
Benjamin Bederson, "Fritz Reiche and the Emergency Committee in Aid of Displaced Foreign Scholars", Physics in perspective 7 p.453-472, 2005
