= Paracrystallinity =

Materials without long-range ordering of their crystal lattices

In materials science, paracrystalline materials are defined as having short- and medium-range ordering in their lattice (similar to the liquid crystal phases) but lacking crystal-like long-range ordering at least in one direction.

== Origin and definition ==
The words "paracrystallinity" and "paracrystal" were coined by the late Friedrich Rinne in the year 1933. Their German equivalents, e.g. "Parakristall", appeared in print one year earlier. A general theory of paracrystals has been formulated in a basic textbook, and then further developed/refined by various authors.

Rolf Hosemann's definition of an ideal paracrystal is: "The electron density distribution of any material is equivalent to that of a paracrystal when there is for every building block one ideal point so that the distance statistics to other ideal points are identical for all of these points. The electron configuration of each building block around its ideal point is statistically independent of its counterpart in neighboring building blocks. A building block corresponds then to the material content of a cell of this "blurred" space lattice, which is to be considered a paracrystal."

== Theory ==
Ordering is the regularity in which atoms appear in a predictable lattice, as measured from one point. In a highly ordered, perfectly crystalline material, or single crystal, the location of every atom in the structure can be described exactly measuring out from a single origin. Conversely, in a disordered structure such as a liquid or amorphous solid, the location of the nearest and, perhaps, second-nearest neighbors can be described from an origin (with some degree of uncertainty) and the ability to predict locations decreases rapidly from there out. The distance at which atom locations can be predicted is referred to as the correlation length $\xi$. A paracrystalline material exhibits a correlation somewhere between the fully amorphous and fully crystalline.

The primary, most accessible source of crystallinity information is X-ray diffraction and cryo-electron microscopy, although other techniques may be needed to observe the complex structure of paracrystalline materials, such as fluctuation electron microscopy in combination with density of states modeling of electronic and vibrational states. Scanning transmission electron microscopy can provide real-space and reciprocal space characterization of paracrystallinity in nanoscale material, such as quantum dot solids.

The scattering of X-rays, neutrons and electrons on paracrystals is quantitatively described by the theories of the ideal and real paracrystal.

Numerical differences in analyses of diffraction experiments on the basis of either of these two theories of paracrystallinity can often be neglected.

Just like ideal crystals, ideal paracrystals extend theoretically to infinity. Real paracrystals, on the other hand, follow the empirical α*-law, which restricts their size. That size is also indirectly proportional to the components of the tensor of the paracrystalline distortion. Larger solid state aggregates are then composed of micro-paracrystals.

== Applications ==
The paracrystal model has been useful, for example, in describing the state of partially amorphous semiconductor materials after deposition. It has also been successfully applied to synthetic polymers, liquid crystals, biopolymers, quantum dot solids, and biomembranes.

== See also ==
- Amorphous solid
- Crystallite
- Crystallography
- DNA
- Single crystal
- X-ray pattern of a B-DNA paracrystal
- X-ray scattering techniques
