= Rudolf Brill =

German chemist (1899–1989)

Rudolf Brill (September 7, 1899 – February 17, 1989) was a German chemist who was born in Eschwege and died in Lenggries.

== Education and career ==
Rudolf Friedrich Heinrich Erhard Ernst Brill was born in Eschwege in 1899 as the son of a businessman. From 1918 to 1922, he studied chemistry at the Technische Hochschule Berlin-Charlottenburg. On May 13, 1922, he earned the diploma in engineering here. On October 15, 1923, he was promoted to PhD with the dissertation title Röntgenographische Untersuchungen. Ein Beitrag zur chemischen Konstitution des Seidenfibroins. His supervisor was Reginald Oliver Herzog at the Kaiser Wilhelm Institute.

After completing his doctorate, he moved to a research laboratory at IG Farben in Ludwigshafen-Oppau, where he worked from 1923 till 1941. During this time, Brill published the first work on electron densities in crystals and established the experimental method for the determination of electron densities.

In 1941, Brill became the successor to Eduard Zintl, who had died in January 1941, at the Technische Hochschule Darmstadt. Brill was appointed to the Chair of Inorganic and Physical Chemistry and at the same time was made head of the institute. Due to his special professional and organizational skills, Brill was the only candidate that the university suggested to the state government. As the successor to Eduard Zintl, who was promoted by the Gauleiter Jakob Sprenger, Brill had a new building, about half-completed, with generous financial and human resources at his disposal. Brill was able to move into his office and some laboratories when he took up his duties.

In the course of his appointment to Darmstadt, Brill applied for admission to the Nazi Party on August 11, 1941, and was admitted on October 1 of the same year (membership number 8,937,739). From 1943 to 1945, Brill was leader of the National Socialist Association of Lecturers at the Technische Hochschule Darmstadt. He was the only docent union leader at the TH Darmstadt who was already a professor at the time he took over the position. According to his colleagues Wilhelm Schlink (physicist) and Erich Reuleaux, he is said to have exercised the office "apolitically".

Brill was involved in "research projects important to the war effort". He was particularly successful in raising third-party funds. In 1942, his institute for inorganic and physical chemistry was classified as a "military enterprise", which was associated with certain privileges for the institute. After the American army marched into Darmstadt in March 1945, the usable parts of the new institute building at Herrngarten were used as a medical center. As a result, there were practically no more job opportunities for Brill.

Brill was dismissed from government service on June 25, 1946, for "political reasons".

From 1941 to 1947 Rudolf Brill was also an honorary professor at the University of Heidelberg. He was one of nine Darmstadt professors and research associates in whom the United States War Department expressed an interest in August 1945. Brill accepted this invitation and arrived in the USA with Operation Overcast in 1947. He initially advised the United States Army Signal Corps at Fort Monmouth, New Jersey. From 1948 he worked in a research laboratory at the Phillips Petroleum Company in Bartlesville, Oklahoma. In 1950 he became a professor at the Polytechnic Institute of Brooklyn in the State of New York.

At the end of the 1950s he returned to Germany. In 1958 he was appointed director of the Fritz Haber Institute of the Max Planck Society in Berlin and took over the management from Max von Laue on March 1, 1959. He retained this position until 1969. From 1967 until his retirement in 1969, he was also Director of the Faculty of Physical Chemistry at the Fritz Haber Institute. From 1958 he was an honorary professor of physical chemistry at the Free University of Berlin and also at the University of Heidelberg.

== Personal life ==
Brill had been married to Else Rudloff since 1924. He died at the age of 89 at his retirement home in Lenggries in Upper Bavaria. His grave is in the Waldfriedhof Darmstadt.

== Honors and awards ==
Brill became an Ordinary member of the Heidelberg Academy of Sciences and Humanities in 1942. He was awarded Johann Joseph Ritter von Prechtl Medal in 1965. He became an honorary member of the German Chemical Society in 1979.
