= Yang Shao-Horn =

Chinese American scholar

- Born: Yang Shao
- Education: Second High School Attached to Beijing Normal University
- Alma mater: Beijing University of Technology (BS); Michigan Technological University (PhD)
- Known for: Clean energy, electrochemistry, material chemistry and catalysis
- Awards: Faraday Medal; US National Academy of Engineering
- Scientific career
- Fields: Chemistry; Materials; Computation; Spectroscopy; Catalysis
- Institutions: Massachusetts Institute of Technology
- Website: https://www.rle.mit.edu/eel/

Yang Shao-Horn is a Chinese American scholar, Professor of Mechanical Engineering and Materials Science and Engineering and a Principal Investigator at the Research Laboratory of Electronics at the Massachusetts Institute of Technology. She is known for research on understanding and controlling of processes for storing electrons in chemical bonds towards zero-carbon energy and chemicals.

== Education ==
Shao-Horn was born in Beijing and was educated at Second High School Attached to Beijing Normal University. She obtained her B.S. in Metallurgical Engineering at Beijing University of Technology, and moved to Michigan Technological University for graduate studies, where her Ph.D. research was focused on mechanistic investigations of Li-ion battery material failures using transmission electron microscopy, co-advised by Stephen A. Hackney and M.M. Thackeray at Argonne National Laboratory.

== Research and career ==
Upon the completion of her Ph.D. in 1998, Shao-Horn joined the Eveready Battery Company in Westlake, Ohio as a staff scientist, during which she researched high-voltage spinel materials for Li-ion batteries, iron disulfide for lithium primary batteries and Alkaline Zn-MnO_{2} batteries. Shao-Horn left Energizer in 2000 and obtained an NSF International Research Fellowship to work with Claude Delmas at the Institute of Condensed Matter Chemistry in Bordeaux, France.

In 2002, she joined the MIT faculty. Shao-Horn's research is centered on exploiting physical/materials chemistry to understand and control the kinetics and dynamics for storing electrons in chemical bonds towards zero-carbon energy and chemicals. She is known for the use of surface electronic structure features and/or solvation environments to develop universal design principles of materials and electrode/electrolyte interface to enhance functions (activity, selectivity, and stability) spanning from making of sustainable chemicals and fuels, via water splitting, carbon dioxide, to rechargeable Li-ion and Li-air batteries.

She has pioneered the oxide electronic structure tuning to develop active catalysts to promote oxygen reduction and evolution kinetics. Shao-Horn and her collaborators have shown that the antibonding orbital filling of surface transition‑metal cations controls the catalytic activity of oxides for oxygen reduction and oxygen evolution in a volcano-shaped dependence over several orders of magnitude. Subsequently, Shao-Horn and her coworkers have shown that increasing the metal-oxygen covalency enhances activity for oxygen evolution but beyond an optimal value reduces oxide stability. Exploiting this concept not only sets record catalytic activity but also establishes a new reaction mechanism, where both metal and oxygen sites can catalyze oxygen evolution and deprotonation from oxide the surface can be rate-limiting. Moreover, such concepts have been applied to elucidate that increasing metal-oxygen covalency of metal oxides can promote the dehydrogenation of organic molecules such as carbonate solvents and electrolyte degradation by late transition metal oxides, which decreases the cycle life of Li-ion batteries and selective oxidation of hydrocarbon fuels.

Shao-horn has given a number of lectures in academia (e.g. Marvel Lecture, Stanford ENERGY and Storage X 2021), at industrial events (e.g., BASF Energy Symposium 2015) and high-level strategic meetings (e.g., Ideaslab of World Economic Forum in Davos). She has advised ~90 students and postdoctoral associates at MIT, who are now pursuing successful careers in industry, national research laboratories, and in academia (~30) including faculty positions at University of Michigan, MIT, Boston College, and Cornell and academic positions in Europe and Asia.

=== Awards and honors ===
Shao-Horn was awarded the Charles W. Tobias Young Investigator Award 2008 for notable contributions to understanding the mechanism of Pt catalyst loss in fuel cells, which has contributed to prolonging the lifetime of fuel cells in consumer vehicles in collaboration with Hubert A. Gasteiger and colleagues at GM, and to enhance oxygen reduction activity for Pt alloy catalysts in fuel cells.

In 2018, Shao-Horn was awarded the Faraday Medal of Royal Society of Chemistry for her contributions to electrochemistry research, and she is the first woman receiving this recognition since its inception in 1977. In 2020, she was awarded the Dr. Karl Wamsler Innovation Award from the Technical University of Munich in appreciation of her visionary electrocatalysis research, developing universal guiding principles to understand and optimize charge transfer at the solid-gas and solid-liquid interface to store energy in chemical bonds. She is the first woman receiving this award since its inception in 2017. She was selected to receive a Humbolt Prize in Chemistry from the Alexander von Humboldt Foundation for fundamental studies of interface at the Fritz Haber Institute.

Shao-Horn is a member of the U.S. National Academy of Engineering since 2018. She is a fellow of the American Association for the Advancement of Science, the Electrochemical Society, the National Academy of Inventors and the International Society of Electrochemistry. She serves as senior editor for Accounts of Materials Research of American Chemical Society (ACS), and on advisory/editorial boards of leading journals such as the Journal of Physical Chemistry in ACS, Energy and Environmental Science from Royal Society of Chemistry (RSC), Advanced Energy Materials and Advanced Functional Materials from Wiley, Materials Today, Chem, Cell Press Chem, and Joule from Elsevier, and the board of directors for International Meetings of Lithium batteries.

=== Selected bibliography ===
1. T. Wang, Y. Zhang, B. Huang, B. Cai, R.R. Rao, L. Giordano, S.G. Sun and Y. Shao-Horn, Enhancing the Catalysis of Oxygen Reduction Reaction via Tuning Interfacial Hydrogen Bonds, Nature Catalysis, 4, 753-762, September 2021.
2. H. Iriawan, S.Z. Andersen, X. Zhang, B. M. Comer, J. Barrio, P. Chen, A.J. Medford, I.E.L. Stephens, I. Chorkendorff and Y. Shao-Horn, Methods for nitrogen activation by reduction and oxidation, Nature Reviews Methods Primers, 1, 56, August 2021.
3. B. Huang, R.R. Rao, S. You, K. H. Myint, Y. Song, Y. Wang, W. Ding, L. Giordano, Y. Zhang, T. Wang, S. Muy, Y. Katayama, J. C. Grossman, A. P. Willard, K. Xu, Y. Jiang and Y. Shao-Horn, Cation- and pH-Dependent Hydrogen Evolution and Oxidation Reaction Kinetics, Journal of the American Chemical Society Au, 14, 6030-6040, August 2021.
4. J. Hwang, R.R. Rao, L. Giordano, K. Akkiraju, X.R. Wang, E. Crumlin and Y. Shao-Horn, Regulating oxygen activity of perovskites to promote NO_{x} oxidation, Nature Catalysis, 4, 663-673, July 2021.
5. R.R. Rao, M.J. Kolb, L. Giordano, A. F. Pederson, Y. Katayama, J. Hwang, A. Mehta, H. You, J.R. Lunger, H. Zhou, N.B. Halck, T. Vegge, I. Chorkendorff, I.E.L. Stephens, and Y. Shao-Horn, Operando Identification of Site-Dependent Water Oxidation Activity on Ruthenium Dioxide Single-Crystal Surfaces, Nature Catalysis, 3, 516-525, May 2020.
6. Y. Zhang, Y. Katayama, R. Tatara, L. Giordano, Y. Yu, D. Fraggedakis, J. Sun, F. Maglia, R. Jung, M.Z. Bazant and Y. Shao-Horn, Revealing Electrolyte Oxidation via Carbonate Dehydrogenation on Ni-based Oxides in Li-ion Batteries by in situ Fourier Transform Infrared Spectroscopy, Energy and Environmental Science, 13, 183-199, November 2019.
7. B.J. Hopkins, Y. Shao-Horn, and D. P. Hart, Suppressing Corrosion In Primary Aluminum–Air Batteries Via Oil Displacement, Science, 362, 658-661, November 2018.
8. J. Hwang, R.R. Rao, L. Giordano, Y. Katayama, Y. Yu, and Y. Shao-Horn, Perovskites in Catalysis and Electrocatalysis, Science, 358, 751-756, November 2017.
9. W. Hong, K.A. Stoerzinger, Y-L. Lee, L. Giordano, A.J.L. Grimaud, A.M. Johnson, J. Hwang, E. Crumlin, W. Yang, Y. Shao-Horn, Charge-transfer-energy-dependent oxygen evolution reaction mechanisms for perovskite oxides, Energy & Environmental Science, 10, 2190-2200, October 2017.
10. L. Giordano, P. Karayaylali, Y. Yu, Y. Katayama, F. Maglia, S. Lux, and Y. Shao-Horn, Chemical Reactivity Descriptor for the Oxide-Electrolyte Interface in Li-Ion Batteries, Journal of Physical Chemistry Letters, 8, 3881-3887, August 2017.
11. W. Hong, K.A. Stoerzinger, Y-L. Lee, L. Giordano, A.J.L. Grimaud, A.M. Johnson, J. Hwang, E. Crumlin, W. Yang, Y. Shao-Horn, Charge-transfer-energy-dependent oxygen evolution reaction mechanisms for perovskite oxides, Energy & Environmental Science, 10, 2190-2200, October 2017.
12. L. Giordano, P. Karayaylali, Y. Yu, Y. Katayama, F. Maglia, S. Lux, and Y. Shao-Horn, Chemical Reactivity Descriptor for the Oxide-Electrolyte Interface in Li-Ion Batteries, Journal of Physical Chemistry Letters, 8, 3881-3887, August 2017.
13. J. Bachman, S. Muy, Grimaud, A., H.H. Chang, N. Pour, S. Lux, O. Paschos, F. Maglia, S. Lupart, P. Lamp, L. Giordano and Y. Shao-Horn, Inorganic Solid-State Electrolytes for Lithium Batteries: Mechanisms and Properties Governing Ion Conduction, Chemical Reviews, 116, 140-162, January 2016.
14. D. Kwabi, V.S. Bryantsev, T.P. Batcho, D. Itkis, C.V. Thompson and Y. Shao-Horn, Experimental and Computational Analysis of the Solvent-Dependent O_{2}/Li^{+}-O_{2}^{−} Redox Couple: Standard Potentials, Coupling Strength and Implications for Lithium-Oxygen Batteries, Angewandte Chemie International Edition, 128, 3181-3186, February 2016.
15. W.T. Hong, K.A. Stoerzinger, B. Mortiz, T.P. Devereaux, W.Yang, and Y. Shao-Horn, Probing LaMO_{3} Metal and Oxygen Partial Density of States Using X-ray Emission, Absorption, and Photoelectron Spectroscopy, Journal of Physical Chemistry C, 119, 2063-2072, 2015.
16. B. Han, C.E. Carlton, A. Kongkanand, R.S. Kukreja, B.R.C. Theobald, L. Gan, R. O'Malley, P. Strasser, F.T. Wagner, and Y. Shao-Horn, Record Activity and Stability of Dealloyed Bimetallic Catalysts for Proton Exchange Membrane Fuel Cells, Energy & Environmental Science, 8, 258-266, 2015.
17. J. Suntivich, K.J. May, H.A. Gasteiger, J.B. Goodenough and Y. Shao-Horn, A Perovskite Oxide Optimized for Oxygen Evolution Catalysis from Molecular Orbital Principles, Science, 334, 1383-1385, 2011.
18. P.J. Ferreira, G.J. la O', Y. Shao-Horn, D. Morgan, R. Makharia, S. Kocha and H. Gasteiger, Instability of Pt/C Electrocatalysts in Proton Exchange Membrane Fuel Cells: A Mechanistic Investigation, Journal of the Electrochemical Society, 152, A2256–A2271, 2005.

=== External links ===
- Delivering life-saving oxygen
- Study unveils details of how a widely used catalyst splits water
- MIT Energy Initiative Podcast: Batteries and Storage
- Researchers clarify mystery about proposed battery material
