= Beatriz Roldán Cuenya =

Spanish physicist

Beatriz Roldán Cuenya (born 1976 in Oviedo) is a Spanish physicist working in surface science and catalysis. Since 2017, she has been director of the Department of Interface Science at the Fritz Haber Institute of the Max Planck Society in Berlin, Germany. Since April 2023, she has also been interim director of the Department of Inorganic Chemistry, also at the Fritz Haber Institute.

== Professional career ==
Roldán Cuenya studied at the University of Oviedo in Spain and received her doctorate degree from the University of Duisburg-Essen in Germany under the supervision of Werner Keune. As a postdoc she worked at the University of California, Santa Barbara in the group of Eric McFarland and subsequently became professor at the University of Central Florida in Orlando (USA). In 2013, she accepted a Chair Faculty position in Solid State Physics at the Ruhr University Bochum in Germany. She holds two roles at the Fritz Haber Institute - since 2017 as Director of the Department of Interface Science, and since April 2023 as interim Director of the Department of Inorganic Chemistry.

Her main research interests are the synthesis of nanostructured materials with tunable surface properties and the experimental investigation of structure-reactivity relationships in thermal and electro-catalysis using in situ and operando methods. Applications of her work are in the areas of environmental remediation and energy conversion.

== Awards and distinctions ==
- 2005 National Science Foundation CAREER Award of the American National Science Foundation
- 2009 Peter Mark Memorial Award, American Vacuum Society
- 2009 University of Central Florida, Research Incentive Award
- 2016 Fellow of the Max Planck Society at the Max Planck Institute for Chemical Energy Conversion (Mülheim, Germany)
- 2016 European Research Council Consolidator Award
- 2020 Elected Member of the Academia Europaea, the Academy of Europe
- 2021 ISE-Elsevier Prize for Experimental Electrochemistry of the International Society of Electrochemistry (ISE)
- 2022 Paul H. Emmett Award from the North American Catalysis Society for Fundamental Catalysis

== Publications ==
- I. Zegkinoglou, A. Zendegani, I. Sinev, S. Kunze, H. Mistry, H. S. Jeon, J. Zhao, M. Hu, E. E. Alp, S. Piontek, M. Smialkowski, U.-P. Apfel, F. Körmann, J. Neugebauer, T. Hickel, B. Roldan Cuenya: Operando phonon studies of the protonation mechanism in highly active hydrogen evolution reaction pentlandite catalysts, JACS 2017, 139, 14360, doi:10.1021/jacs.7b07902
- H. Mistry, Y. Choi, A. Bagger, F. Scholten, C. Bonifacio, I. Sinev, N. J. Divins, I. Zegkinoglou, H. Jeon, K. Kisslinger, E. A. Stach, J. C. Yang, J. Rossmeisl, B. Roldan Cuenya: Enhanced carbon dioxide electroreduction to carbon monoxide over defect rich plasma-activated silver catalysts, Angew. Chem. 2017, 56, 11394, doi:10.1002/anie.201704613
- H. Mistry, A. Varela, C. S. Bonifacio, I. Zegkinoglou, I. Sinev, Y.-W. Choi, K. Kisslinger, E. A. Stach, J. C. Yang, P. Strasser, B. Roldan Cuenya, Highly selective plasma-activated copper catalysts for carbon dioxide reduction to ethylene, Nature Commun. 2016, 7, 12123, doi:10.1038/ncomms12123.
