= Karsten Reuter =

German physicist and chemist

- Born: 13 June 1970 (age 56); Offenbach am Main, Germany
- Education: University of Erlangen-Nürnberg; University of York
- Scientific career
- Institutions: Technical University of Munich; Fritz Haber Institute of the Max Planck Society
- Doctoral advisor: Klaus Heinz
- Website: www.fhi.mpg.de/th-department/director

Karsten Reuter (born 13 June 1970 in Offenbach am Main) is a German physicist and chemist.

== Life and work ==
Reuter studied physics at the Friedrich-Alexander-Universität Erlangen-Nürnberg and the University of York. He conducted his doctoral studies at the CSIC Instituto de Ciencia de Materiales de Madrid (ICMM) and in Erlangen, where he received his doctorate in 1995 under Prof. Dr. Klaus Heinz for his work on electronic transport across metal-semiconductor interfaces. After postdoctoral studies at the Fritz-Haber-Institut (FHI) der Max-Planck-Gesellschaft (MPG) in Berlin and at the FOM Institute for Atomic and Molecular Physics (AMOLF) in Amsterdam, he led an Independent MPG Research Group at the FHI from 2005 to 2009 and completed his Habilitation in Theoretical Solid State Physics at the FU Berlin in 2005. From 2009 to 2020 he held the chair for theoretical chemistry at the Technical University of Munich (TUM) und was a member of the TUM Catalysis Research Center. Since 2020 he is director and scientific member at the Berlin Fritz-Haber-Institut der MPG.

Reuter's research activities focus on a quantitative modeling of materials properties and functions. Specifically, he addresses processes in working catalysts and energy conversion devices such as electrolyzers, fuel cells or batteries. For this, he advances predictive-quality multiscale models and data science approaches, uniting methods and concepts from physics, chemistry, machine learning, as well as materials science and engineering.

== Honors and awards ==
For his work, Reuter received multiple awards and distinctions. In 2018, he was awarded the Frontiers Award for Chemical Energy Conversion. Recent visiting professorships include Stanford (2014–2015), the Massachusetts Institute of Technology (2018) and the Imperial College London (2019–2020).
