= Sociedad Uruguaya de Historia de la Medicina =

Organization in Uruguay

Uruguayan Society for the History of Medicine
- Sociedad Uruguaya de Historia de la Medicina
- Abbreviation: SUHM
- Established: September 8, 1970; 56 years ago
- Type: Nonprofit
- Purpose: History of medicine in Uruguay
- Location: Montevideo, Uruguay
- President: Dr. Antonio Turnes
- Website: suhm.uy

The Sociedad Uruguaya de Historia de la Medicina (English: Uruguayan Society for the History of Medicine, acronym SUHM) is a learned society devoted to history of medicine in Uruguay. Headquartered in the School of Medicine, University of the Republic, it was established in 1970.
