= Rolf Hosemann =

German physicist (1912–1994)

Rolf Hosemann (20 April 1912 in Rostock – 28 September 1994 in Berlin) was a German physicist who laid the mathematical foundations for paracrystallinity.

== Education and career ==
Hosemann was born in Rostock and studied at the University of Marburg and the University of Freiburg. In 1936, he received his doctorate in Freiburg. He had received the topic of his dissertation The Radioactivity of Samarium from his academic teacher George de Hevesy, who had to leave Germany in 1934 because of his Jewish descent. In 1939 he received his habilitation with a thesis on small-angle X-ray scattering on cellulose. In 1951 he became a research associate with Max von Laue at the Kaiser Wilhelm Institute for Physical Chemistry and Electrochemistry in Berlin, which later became the Fritz Haber Institute. In 1960 he was put in charge of his own department at the Fritz Haber Institute, and in 1966 the Max Planck Society appointed him a scientific member.

Hosemann retired from the Fritz Haber Institute in 1980 and moved to the Federal Institute for Materials Research and Testing in Berlin, where he continued the research on paracrystals until 1987.

On 18 February 1974 the chemistry department of the Free University of Berlin awarded him an honorary doctorate in recognition of his services to the development of theoretical crystallography, in particular the theory of paracrystals, and his fundamental work on the structure of macromolecules.

== Personal life ==
Hosemann was married to Ursula (née Siebold), with whom he had four sons.
