= Gerhard Ertl =

German physicist (born 1936)

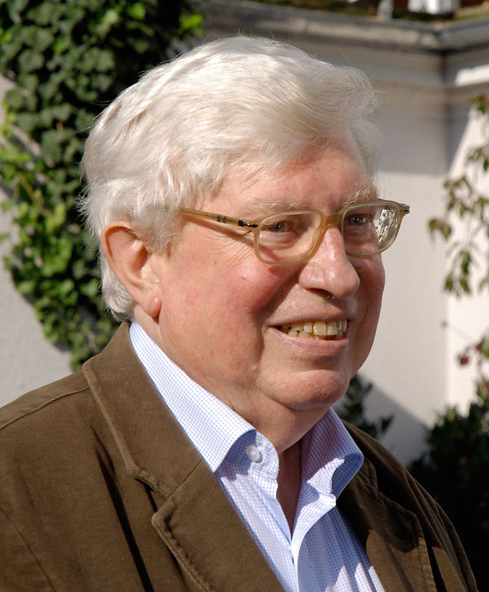
- Ertl in 2007
- Born: 10 October 1936 (age 90); Stuttgart-Bad Cannstatt, Baden-Württemberg, Germany
- Education: University of Stuttgart; Technical University of Munich
- Known for: Surface chemistry
- Awards: EPS Europhysics Prize (1992); Japan Prize (1992); Wolf Prize in Chemistry (1998); Nobel Prize in Chemistry (2007); Otto Hahn Prize (2007); Faraday Lectureship Prize (2007)
- Scientific career
- Fields: Surface chemistry
- Workplaces: Technical University of Munich; Leibniz University Hannover; LMU Munich; Fritz Haber Institute of the MPG
- Doctoral advisor: Heinz Gerischer
- Doctoral students: Martin Wolf

Gerhard Ertl (German pronunciation: [ˈɡeːɐ̯haʁt ˈʔɛʁtl̩]; born 10 October 1936) is a German physicist and a Professor emeritus at the Department of Physical Chemistry, Fritz-Haber-Institut der Max-Planck-Gesellschaft in Berlin, Germany. Ertl's research laid the foundation of modern surface chemistry, which has helped explain how fuel cells produce energy without pollution, how catalytic converters clean up car exhausts and even why iron rusts, the Royal Swedish Academy of Sciences said.

His work has paved the way for development of cleaner energy sources and will guide the development of fuel cells, said Astrid Graslund, secretary of the Nobel Committee for Chemistry.

He was awarded the 2007 Nobel Prize in Chemistry for his studies of chemical processes on solid surfaces. The Nobel academy said Ertl provided a detailed description of how chemical reactions take place on surfaces. His findings applied in both academic studies and industrial development, the academy said. “Surface chemistry can even explain the destruction of the ozone layer, as vital steps in the reaction actually take place on the surfaces of small crystals of ice in the stratosphere,” the award citation reads.

In 2015, Ertl signed the Mainau Declaration 2015 on Climate Change on the final day of the 65th Lindau Nobel Laureate Meeting. The declaration was signed by a total of 76 Nobel Laureates and handed to then-President of the French Republic, François Hollande, as part of the COP21 climate summit in Paris.

== Biography ==
Ertl was born in Stuttgart, Germany, where he studied physics from 1955 to 1957 at the Technische Hochschule Stuttgart and then at the University of Paris (1957–1958) and LMU Munich (1958–1959). He completed his Diplom in Physics at the Technische Hochschule Stuttgart in 1961, followed his thesis advisor Heinz Gerischer from the Max Planck Institute for Metals Research in Stuttgart to Munich and received his PhD degree from the Technische Hochschule München in 1965.

=== Academic career ===
After completing his PhD, he became an assistant and lecturer at Technische Hochschule München (1965–1968). From 1968 to 1973, he was professor and director at Technische Hochschule Hannover; then, he became a professor at Institute for Physical Chemistry, LMU Munich (1973–1986). During the 1970s and 80s, he was also a visiting professor at the California Institute of Technology (1976–1977), the University of Wisconsin–Milwaukee (1979) and the University of California, Berkeley (1981–82).

He became the director at the Fritz Haber Institute of the MPG from 1986 till his retirement in 2004. In 1986, as honors, he was named "Honorary Professor" at the Free University of Berlin and at the Technische Universität Berlin, and in 1996 at the Humboldt University of Berlin.

From 2008 to 2016, Ertl served as a member of the university council of Technische Universität Darmstadt.

=== Research ===
Gerhard Ertl is known for determining the detailed molecular mechanisms of the catalytic synthesis of ammonia over iron (Haber Bosch process) and the catalytic oxidation of carbon monoxide over platinum (catalytic converter). During his research he discovered the important phenomenon of oscillatory reactions on platinum surfaces and, using photoelectron microscopy, was able to image for the first time, the oscillating changes in surface structure and coverage that occur during reaction.

He always used new observation techniques like low-energy electron diffraction (LEED) at the beginning of his career, later ultraviolet photoelectron spectroscopy (UPS) and scanning tunneling microscope (STM) yielding ground breaking results. He won the Wolf Prize in Chemistry in 1998 along with Gabor A. Somorjai of the University of California, Berkeley for "their outstanding contributions to the field of the surface science in general and for their elucidation of fundamental mechanisms of heterogeneous catalytic reactions at single crystal surface in particular."

Gerhard Ertl was awarded the 2007 Nobel Prize in Chemistry for his studies of chemical processes on solid surfaces. The award, worth SEK 10 million (US$1.7 million, £1.15 million), was announced on Ertl's 71st birthday. "I am speechless", Ertl told Associated Press from his office in Berlin. "I was not counting on this."

As of November 2022, Ertl has an h-index of 124 according to Scopus.

=== Personal life ===
Ertl and his wife Barbara have two children and several grandchildren. His hobbies include playing the piano and also playing with his cats when he is not doing experiments. He identifies as Christian.

== Publications ==
Ertl, Gerhard (2023). My Life with Science. Berlin: GNT Publishing GmbH. doi:10.47261/1558. ISBN 978-3-86225-131-5. e-book: ISBN 978-3-86225-558-0

Ertl is one of the editors of the Handbook of Heterogeneous Catalysis. (ISBN 978-3-527-31241-2)

Ertl is the co-editor of Engineering Of Chemical Complexity. 2013, World Scientific Publishing. (ISBN 978-981-4390-45-3)
