= Energy & Environmental Science =

- Discipline: Energy
- Language: English
- Edited by: Jenny Nelson

Publication details
- History: 2008–present
- Publisher: Royal Society of Chemistry (United Kingdom)
- Frequency: Monthly
- Impact factor: 39.714 (2021)

Standard abbreviations
- ISO 4: Energy Environ. Sci.

Indexing
- CODEN: EESNBY
- ISSN: 1754-5692 (print); 1754-5706 (web)
- LCCN: 2009240440
- OCLC no.: 256525221

Links
- Journal homepage; Online archive

Energy & Environmental Science, also known as EES, is a monthly peer-reviewed scientific journal publishing original (primary) research and review articles. The journal covers agenda-setting work of an interdisciplinary nature relating to energy science. Energy & Environmental Science is published by the Royal Society of Chemistry.

According to the Journal Citation Reports, the journal has a 2023 impact factor of 32.4. The editor-in-chief is Jenny Nelson (Imperial College London).

In 2022, the Royal Society of Chemistry launched its first companion journal EES Catalysis, followed by two further new companion journals EES Batteries and EES Solar in 2024. With Energy & Environmental Science as the flagship family journal, these four journals now make up the EES Family.

== Article types ==
Energy & Environmental Science publishes the following types of articles: Research Papers (original scientific work); Review Articles, Perspectives, and Minireviews (feature review-type articles of broad interest); Communications (original scientific work of an urgent nature), Opinions (personal, often speculative, viewpoints or hypotheses on a current topic), and Analysis Articles (in-depth examination of energy and environmental technologies, strategies, policies, and general conceptual frameworks of general interest).

== Abstracting and indexing ==
According to the Thomson Reuters Master Journal List and CASSI, this journal is indexed by the following services:

- Science Citation Index Expanded
- Current Contents/ Agriculture, Biology & Environmental Sciences
- Current Contents/ Physical, Chemical & Earth Sciences
- Current Contents/ Engineering, Computing & Technology
- Chemical Abstracts Service - CASSI
