= Stefan Grimme =

German physical chemist

- Born: 4 September 1963; Braunschweig, Germany
- Education: Technical University of Braunschweig
- Scientific career
- Fields: physical chemistry, computational chemistry
- Workplaces: University of Bonn
- Doctoral advisor: Herbert Dreeskamp

Stefan Grimme (born 4 September 1963), is a German physical chemist. He completed a Ph.D. thesis on photochemistry at Technical University of Braunschweig in 1991, and has been a professor at the Universität Bonn since 2011. Grimme is active in the field of computational chemistry and was elected a member of the Academy of Sciences Leopoldina in 2018.

== Works ==
- Grimme, Stefan; Hansen, Andreas; Brandenburg, Jan Gerit; Bannwarth, Christoph (2016). "Dispersion-Corrected Mean-Field Electronic Structure Methods". Chemical Reviews. 116 (9): 5105–5154. doi:10.1021/acs.chemrev.5b00533. ISSN 0009-2665. PMID 27077966.
- Brandenburg, Jan Gerit; Hochheim, Manuel; Bredow, Thomas; Grimme, Stefan (2014). "Low-Cost Quantum Chemical Methods for Noncovalent Interactions". The Journal of Physical Chemistry Letters. 5 (24): 4275–4284. doi:10.1021/jz5021313. ISSN 1948-7185. PMID 26273974.

== Literature ==
- Steven M. Bachrach: Stefan Grimme // Computational Organic Chemistry, 2014.

== Awards ==
- 2025 Chemistry Europe Award
- 2024 Van-der-Waals-Prize for Senior Scientists for 2025 awarded by the International Advisory Board of the International Conferences on Noncovalent Interactions
- 2019 Appointed as Max-Planck-Fellow at the Max Planck Institute for Coal Research, Mülheim
- 2015 Karl-Ziegler Lectureship Award from Max Planck Institute for Coal Research, Mülheim
- 2015 Gottfried Wilhelm Leibniz Prize from Deutsche Forschungsgemeinschaft
- 2014 Thomson Reuters listed Prof. Dr. Stefan Grimme as a "highly cited chemist" for 2002–2012 in a list of only 300 chemists worldwide
- 2013 Schrödinger Medal of the World Association of Theoretical and Computational Chemists (WATOC)

== See also ==
- Jörg Behler
- Martin A. Suhm
- Frank Neese
