= Renato Zenobi =

Swiss chemist

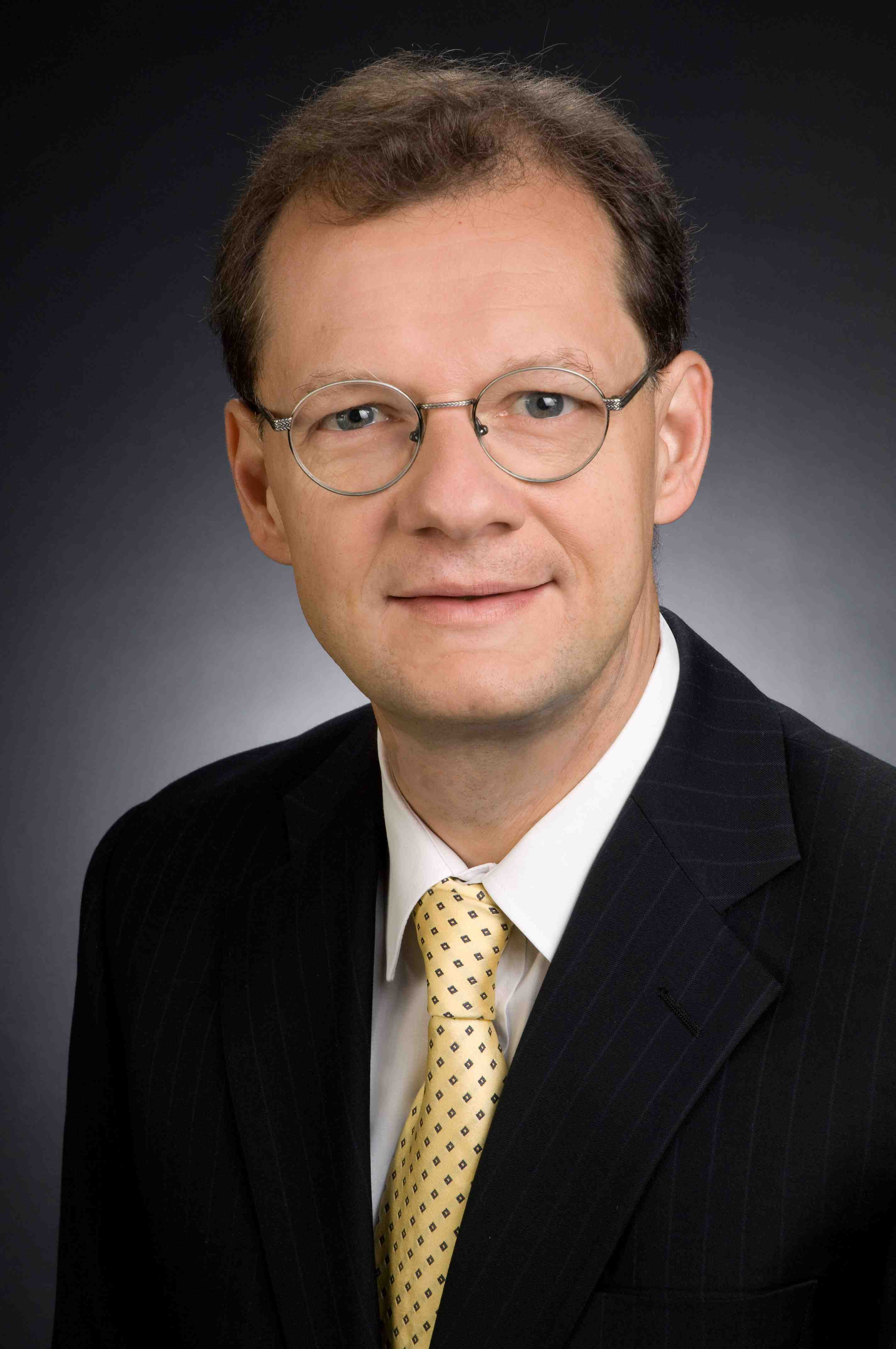
- Renato Zenobi
- Born: 1961 (age 64–65)
- Education: ETH Zurich; Stanford University
- Known for: Mass Spectrometry
- Awards: Thomson Medal (2014); Fresenius Prize (2015)
- Scientific career
- Fields: Chemist
- Workplaces: ETH Zurich
- Website: www.zenobi.ethz.ch

Renato Zenobi (born 1961 in Zurich) is a Swiss chemist. He is Professor of Chemistry at ETH Zurich. Throughout his career, Zenobi has contributed to the field of analytical chemistry.

== Biography ==
Zenobi received his M.Sc. degree from ETH Zurich (Switzerland) in 1986 and a Ph.D. from Stanford University (United States) in 1990. He was a postdoctoral fellow at the University of Pittsburgh (United States; 1990–1991) and at the University of Michigan (United States; 1991). In 1992 he worked as Werner Fellow at the École Polytechnique Fédérale de Lausanne (Switzerland). He became assistant professor at the ETH Zurich in 1995, was promoted to associate professor in 1997, and to full professor in 2000. Between 2010 and 2021, he was one of the associate editors of the journal Analytical Chemistry (ACS).

== Research and achievements ==
Zenobi's research areas include: laser-based analytical chemistry, electrospray and laser-assisted mass spectrometry, laser-surface interactions, near-field optical microscopy / spectroscopy as well as Single-Cell Analysis.

He has made contributions to the understanding of the ion formation mechanism in matrix-assisted laser desorption/ionization (MALDI) mass spectrometry (MS) and to the development of analytical tools for the nanoscale, most notably by inventing tip-enhanced Raman spectroscopy (TERS).

== Awards ==
- 2015 Fresenius Prize (German Chemical Society / GDCh)
- 2014 RUSNANO Prize
- 2014 Thomson Medal (International Mass Spectrometry Foundation)
- 2012 Fresenius Lectureship (German Chemical Society / GDCh)
- 2010 Honorary Professorship, Chinese Academy of Sciences (Changchun / CIAC)
- 2010 Honorary Professorship, Changchun University of Chinese Medicine
- 2010 Honorary Adjunct Professorship, Hunan University (China)
- 2010 Mayent/Rothschild Fellowship, Institut Curie (Paris, France)
- 2009 Honorary Lifetime Membership Israel Chemical Society (Israel)
- 2009 Schulich Graduate Lectureship Technion, Haifa (Israel)
- 2007 Honorary Professorship, East China Institute of Technology (Fuzhou, China)
- 2006 Michael Widmer Award (Novartis Pharma & Swiss Chemical Society)
- 2006 Hobart H. Willard Lectureship (University of Michigan, Ann Arbor)
- 2006 Michael Widmer Award (Novartis Pharma & Swiss Chemical Society)
- 2005 Theophilus Redwood Lecturer (Royal Society of Chemistry)
- 1998 H.E. Merck Award for Analytical Chemistry
- 1993 Ruzicka Prize, awarded by ETH Zürich
- 1991 Alfred-Werner Fellowship
- 1990 Andrew Mellon Postdoctoral Fellowship
- 1989 Thomas Hirschfeld Award (Federation of Analytical Chemistry and Spectroscopy Societies, USA)

== Key Publications ==
In the area of Near-Field Optics & Tip-enhanced Raman Spectroscopy:

- R. M. Stöckle, C. Fokas, V. Deckert, R. Zenobi, B. Sick. B. Hecht, and U. P. Wild, High Quality Near-Field Optical Probes by Tube Etching, Appl. Phys. Lett. 75, 160-162 (1999).
- R. Stöckle, Y. D. Suh, V. Deckert, and R. Zenobi, Nanoscale chemical analysis by Tip-enhanced Raman Scattering, Chem. Phys. Lett. 318, 131-136 (2000).
- B. Hecht, B. Sick, U. P. Wild, V. Deckert, R. Zenobi, O. F. Martin, and D.W. Pohl, Scanning Near-Field Optical Microscopy and Spectroscopy with Aperture Probes: Fundamentals and Applications, J. Chem. Phys. 112, 7761-7774 (2000).
- W. Zhang, B.-S. Yeo, T. Schmid, and R. Zenobi, Single Molecule Tip-enhanced Raman Spectroscopy with Silver tips, J. Phys. Chem. C 111, 1733-1738 (2007).
- B.-S. Yeo, J. Stadler, T. Schmid, and R. Zenobi, Tip-Enhanced Raman Spectroscopy – its Status, Challenges, and Future Directions, Chem. Phys. Lett. 472, 1-13 (2009), “Fontiers” article.

In the area of Mass Spectrometric Analyses of Complex Samples:

- M. Kalberer et al., First Identification of Polymers as Major Component of Atmospheric Organic Aerosols, Science 303, 1659-1662 (2004).
- R. Zenobi, Single-Cell Metabolomics: Analytical and Biological Perspectives, Science 342, 1243259 (2013).

In the area of Mass Spectrometric Studies of Noncovalent Interactions:

- J. M. Daniel, S. D. Friess, S. Rajagopalan, S. Wendt, and R. Zenobi, Quantitative Determination of Noncovalent Binding Interactions using Soft Ionization Mass Spectrometry, Int. J. Mass Spectrom. 216, 1-27 (2002).
- V. Frankevich, K. Barylyuk, K. Chingin. R. Nieckarz, and R. Zenobi, Native Molecules in the Gas Phase? The Case of Green Fluorescent Protein, ChemPhysChem 14, 929-935 (2013).

In the area of MALDI Mass Spectrometry:

- R. Knochenmuss and R. Zenobi, MALDI Ionization: In-Plume Processes, Chem. Rev. 103, 441-452 (2003).
- R. J. Wenzel, U. Matter, L. Schultheis, and R. Zenobi, Sensitive Analysis of Megadalton Ions using Cryodetection MALDI Time-of-flight Mass Spectrometry, Anal. Chem. 77, 4329 -4373 (2005).

In the area of Ambient Mass Spectrometry:

- H. Chen, A. Wortmann, W. Zhang, and R. Zenobi, Rapid in-vivo Finterprinting of Non-volatile Compounds in Breath by Extractive Electrospray Ionization Quadrupole Time-of-Flight Mass Spectrometry, Angew. Chem. Internat. Ed. 119, 580-583 (2007).
- H. Chen, S. Yang, A. Wortmann, and R. Zenobi, Neutral Desorption Sampling of Living Objects for Rapid Analysis by Extractive Electrospray Ionization Mass Spectrometry, Angew. Chem. 119, 7735-7738 (2007); Angew. Chem. Int. Ed. 46, 7591-7594 (2007).
- H. Chen, G. Gamez, and R. Zenobi, What can we Learn from Ambient Ionization Techniques? J. Am. Soc. Mass Spectrom. (Critical Insight) 20, 1947-1963 (2009)
- L. Zhu, G. Gamez, H. Chen, K. Chingin, and R. Zenobi, Rapid Detection of Melamine in Untreated Milk and Wheat Gluten by Ultrasound-assisted Extractive Electrospray Ionization Mass Spectrometry (EESI-MS), Chem. Comm. 559-561 (2009).

== See also ==
- Electrospray ionization
- Matrix-assisted laser desorption/ionization
- Micro-arrays for mass spectrometry
