= Martin Winter (chemist) =

German chemist and university teacher (born 1965)

Martin Winter (born 7 August 1965) is a German chemist and materials scientist from Osnabrück. His research in the field of electrochemical energy storage and conversion focuses on the development of new materials, components and cell designs for batteries and supercapacitors, lithium ion batteries and lithium metal batteries.

== Career and research ==
Winter graduated in chemistry from the University of Münster (Westfälische Wilhelms-Universität Münster) in 1992. He obtained his Ph.D. (1995) under the professorship of Jürgen O. Besenhard and worked as Post-Doctoral Research Fellow with Prof. Petr Novak at the Paul Scherrer Institute in Switzerland. After habilitation in 1999, Winter held a full professorship and the chair at the Institute of Chemical Technology of Inorganic Materials at the TU Graz. In 2008 he came back to Münster to hold the professorship for “Materials Science, Energy and Electrochemistry” at the Institute of Physical Chemistry at the University of Münster. The full professorship developed from an endowed full professorship funded by the companies Volkswagen, Evonik Industries and Chemetall (today Albemarle) from 2008 to 2012. He was a full professor of “Applied Materials Science for Electrochemical Energy Storage and Conversion” between 2008 and 2016 and has been a full professor of “Materials Science, Energy and Electrochemistry” since 2016.

In 2008 Winter founded the MEET Battery Research Center at the University of Münster. Until today he is the scientific director of MEET, which stands for „Münster Electrochemical Energy Technology“. Since January 2015 he is also the founding director of the Helmholtz-Institute Münster (HI MS) “Ionics in Energy Storage”, which is part of the Institute of Energy and Climate Research (IEK) of Forschungszentrum Jülich.

His expertise in battery research led to diverse advisory positions and activities. As the chairman of the Advisory Board of German Battery Research by the Federal Ministry of Education and Research (BMBF), former spokesman of the Innovation Alliance LIB2015, spokesman of the battery initiative Batterie2020 of the BMBF, head of the Battery Competence Center (ElektroMobilität NRW) and member of the "Electromobility" expert council of the North Rhine-Westphalian state government he represents the German battery research on national and international level. Winter is President of the International Meeting on Lithium Batteries (IMLB), chairman of the International Battery Materials Association (IBA), Fellow of the International Society of Electrochemistry (ISE) and of the Electrochemical Society (ECS), where he is also board member of the Battery Division. He has published more than 500 articles in journals, books and proceedings and has filed ca. 70 patent applications (2018).

== Awards and honors ==
Winter is a highly cited author as recognized by ISI (Thomson Reuters), The Shanghai Ranking, and Elsevier Scopus. Among more than 40 awards and recognitions, he holds the Carl Wagner Memorial Award of the Electrochemical Society (ECS), has been the recipient of the Research and Technology awards of both, the ECS and the International Battery Materials Association (IBA) and was recognized by the “Braunschweiger Forschungspreis”. In 2018 he was awarded the Federal Cross of Merit 1st class. Winter is Honorary Professor at the National Taiwan University of Science and Technology (Taipei, Taiwan) and the National Cheng Kung University in Tainan (Taiwan).

== Literature (selection) ==
- Schmuch, Richard; Wagner, Ralf; Hörpel, Gerhard; Placke, Tobias; Winter, Martin (2018). "Performance and cost of materials for lithium-based rechargeable automotive batteries". Nature Energy. 3 (4). Springer Science and Business Media LLC: 267–278. Bibcode:2018NatEn...3..267S. doi:10.1038/s41560-018-0107-2. ISSN 2058-7546. S2CID 139370819.
- Placke, Tobias; Kloepsch, Richard; Dühnen, Simon; Winter, Martin (17 May 2017). "Lithium ion, lithium metal, and alternative rechargeable battery technologies: the odyssey for high energy density". Journal of Solid State Electrochemistry. 21 (7). Springer Science and Business Media LLC: 1939–1964. doi:10.1007/s10008-017-3610-7. ISSN 1432-8488. S2CID 54876714.
- Meister, Paul; Jia, Haiping; Li, Jie; Kloepsch, Richard; Winter, Martin; Placke, Tobias (4 October 2016). "Best Practice: Performance and Cost Evaluation of Lithium Ion Battery Active Materials with Special Emphasis on Energy Efficiency". Chemistry of Materials. 28 (20). American Chemical Society (ACS): 7203–7217. doi:10.1021/acs.chemmater.6b02895. ISSN 0897-4756.
- Winter, Martin (1 December 2009). "The Solid Electrolyte Interphase – The Most Important and the Least Understood Solid Electrolyte in Rechargeable Li Batteries". Zeitschrift für Physikalische Chemie. 223 (10–11). Walter de Gruyter GmbH: 1395–1406. doi:10.1524/zpch.2009.6086. ISSN 2196-7156. S2CID 96080348.
- Winter, Martin; Brodd, Ralph J. (28 September 2004). "What Are Batteries, Fuel Cells, and Supercapacitors?". Chemical Reviews. 104 (10). American Chemical Society (ACS): 4245–4270. doi:10.1021/cr020730k. ISSN 0009-2665. PMID 15669155.
- Winter, Martin; Besenhard, Jürgen O. (1999). "Electrochemical lithiation of tin and tin-based intermetallics and composites". Electrochimica Acta. 45 (1–2). Elsevier BV: 31–50. doi:10.1016/s0013-4686(99)00191-7. ISSN 0013-4686.
- Winter, Martin; Besenhard, Jürgen O.; Spahr, Michael E.; Novák, Petr (1998). "Insertion Electrode Materials for Rechargeable Lithium Batteries". Advanced Materials. 10 (10). Wiley: 725–763. doi:10.1002/(sici)1521-4095(199807)10:10<725::aid-adma725>3.0.co;2-z. ISSN 0935-9648.
