= Heinz Gerischer =

German chemist (1919–1994)

- Born: 31 March 1919; Wittenberg, Germany
- Died: 14 September 1994 (aged 75); Berlin, Germany
- Education: Leipzig University
- Scientific career
- Workplaces: University of Stuttgart; Technical University of Munich; Fritz Haber Institute of the MPG
- Thesis: Die periodischen Vorgänge bei der elektrolytischen Auflösung von Kupfer in Salzsäure (1946)
- Doctoral advisor: Karl Friedrich Bonhoeffer
- Doctoral students: Gerhard Ertl

Heinz Gerischer (31 March 1919 – 14 September 1994) was a German chemist who specialized in electrochemistry. He was the thesis advisor of future Nobel laureate Gerhard Ertl.

The Heinz Gerischer Award of the European section of The Electrochemical Society is named in his honour.

== Academic career ==
Gerischer studied chemistry at Leipzig University between 1937 and 1944 with a two-year interruption because of military service. In 1942, he was expelled from the German army because his mother was born Jewish; he was thus found “undeserving to have a part in the great victories of the German Army.” The war years were difficult for Gerischer, and his mother committed suicide on the eve of her 65th birthday in 1943. His only sister, Ruth (born in 1913), lived underground after escaping from a Gestapo prison and was subsequently killed in an air raid in 1944.

In Leipzig, Gerischer joined the group of Karl-Friedrich Bonhöffer, a member of a distinguished family, whose members were persecuted and murdered because of their opposition to Nazi ideology. Bonhöffer descended from an illustrious chemical lineage of Wilhelm Ostwald (1853–1932) and Walther Hermann Nernst (1864–1941). He kindled Gerischer’s interest in electrochemistry, supervising his doctoral work on oscillating reactions on electrode surfaces. Gerischer completed his doctoral thesis in 1946. Gerischer followed Bonhöffer to Berlin where his Ph.D. supervisor had accepted the directorship of the Institute of Physical Chemistry at the Humboldt University of Berlin. There he also became the department head at the Kaiser Wilhelm Institute for Physical Chemistry in Berlin-Dahlem (later the Fritz Haber Institute of the Max Planck Society). Gerischer himself was appointed as an “Assistänt”; in 1970 he would return to the Fritz Haber Institute as its director. With the Berlin Blockade and the prevailing economic conditions, the post-war research was carried out under extremely difficult conditions.

Gerischer met his future wife, Renate Gersdorf, at the University of Leipzig where she was doing her diploma work with Conrad Weygand. They were married in Berlin in October 1948. In 1949 Gerischer moved his young family to Göttingen to join Bonhöffer as a research associate at the newly established Max Planck Institute for Physical Chemistry. In Berlin and Göttingen and especially during the period from 1949 to 1955, Gerischer was interested in electrode kinetics and developed instruments and techniques for their study. It was he who developed the electronic potentiostat, the most widely used instrument of electrochemists. He also monitored fast electrode processes by double potential step and AC modulation. This work laid the foundation for a mechanistic interpretation of electrode reactions and had a lasting impact on our understanding of electrode kinetics. It was recognized by the newly minted Bodenstein Prize of the Deutsche Bunsen-Gesellschaft, which Gerischer and Klaus Vetter jointly received in 1953.

Gerischer was appointed in 1954 to the position of Department Head and Senior Research Fellow at the Max Planck Institute for Metal Research in Stuttgart. A year later, he received the Habilitation from the University of Stuttgart for his comprehensive study of the discharge of metal ions in corrosion. The years 1954–1961 in Stuttgart were prolific and it was here that Gerischer began his work on semiconductor electrochemistry. It began with a short note on the electrochemistry of n-type and p-type germanium; a study that grew out of a seminar on solid state physics at the university, where the recent results of Brattain and Garrett on germanium were discussed. Gerischer recognized the theoretical implications of semiconductor electrochemistry in charge transfer and its potential applications in photochemistry and photovoltaic devices. His papers considered the differentiation between Faradaic reactions of electrons and holes (1959), the theory of electron tunneling at semiconductor-electrolyte interfaces, solution Fermi levels, and densities of states. He extended his studies to metal electrodes which he studied with his electronic potentiostat (1957), to stress corrosion (1957), to hydrogen evolution and hydrogen adatom formation (1957), to fast electrode processes (1960) and to the reaction kinetics of water dissociation, which he probed by the microwave pulse method (1961).

His work was recognized by his appointment as Associate Professor (“Extraordinariat”) in Electrochemistry at the Technical University of Munich in 1962–63 followed by his promotion to full professor in 1964 and his appointment as Director of the Institute of Physical Chemistry and Electrochemistry. The 1964–1968 period witnessed a flurry of studies from his group on photoelectrochemistry and photosensitization on electrode materials such as ZnO, CdS, GaAs, silver halides, anthracene, and perylene. In 1969–1970 he was named Dean of Natural Sciences at the Technical University of Munich. Gerischer returned to Berlin in 1970 to assume the directorship of the Fritz Haber Institute of the Max Planck Society, where he continued his studies of electrode kinetics, semiconductor electrochemistry, and photoelectrochemistry. After becoming Emeritus Director of the Institute, he worked with Adam Heller in 1990–1991 at the University of Texas at Austin on the rate-controlling role of adsorbed oxygen in titania-assisted photocatalytic processes. His honors and awards included the Olin Palladium Award of the Electrochemical Society (1977), Centenary Lectureship, the Chemical Society, London (1979), DECHEMA Medal, Frankfurt (1982), Electrochemistry Group Medal, The Royal Society of Chemistry, London (1987), Galvani Medal, The Italian Chemical Society (1988), and the Bruno Breyer Medal, The Royal Australian Chemistry Institute (1992).

== Selected contributions ==
- Relating Concentration Polarizations and Electrode Potentials (Kaiser Wilhelm Inst. Berlin, 1951) “Concentration polarization due to the initial chemical reaction in electrolytes and its contribution to the stationary polarization resistance corresponding to the equilibrium potential.” Gerischer, Heinz; Vetter, Klaus J.; Z. physik. Chem.(1951)197, 92–104.
- Theory of AC Electrochemistry (Max Planck Inst. Phys. Chem. Göttingen, 1951) “Alternating-current polarization of electrodes with a potential-determining step for equilibrium potential.” Gerischer, H., Z. physik. Chem. (1951) 198, 286–313
- Discovery of Radicals on Electrodes (Max Planck Inst. Phys. Chem., Göttingen, 1956) “Catalytic decomposition of hydrogen peroxide on metallic platinum.” Gerischer, R; Gerischer, H.; Z. physik. Chem. (1956) 6, 178–200
- Observation of the Different Electrochemical Etching Rates of p and n Type Semiconductors (Max Planck Inst. Metallforsch., Stuttgart, 1957) “Solution of n- and p-germanium in aqueous electrolyte solution under the action of oxidizing agents.” Gerischer, H.; Beck, F.; Z. physik. Chem. (1957) 13, 389-95.
- Invention of the Potentiostat (Max Planck Inst. Metallforsch., Stuttgart, 1957) “The electronic potentiostat and its application in the investigation of fast electrode reactions” Gerischer, H.; Staubach, K. E.; Z. Electrochem.(1957)61, 789-94.
- Explanation of Stress Corrosion (Max-Planck-Inst. Metallforschung, Stuttgart, 1957) “Electrochemical processes in stress corrosion” Gerischer, H.; Werkstoffe u. Korrosion (1957)8, 394-401.
- Discovery of Adatoms, the Existence of Adsorbed Atoms on Electrodes (Max-Planck-Inst. Metallforschung, Stuttgart, 1958) “Mechanism of electrolytic discharge of hydrogen and adsorption energy of atomic hydrogen” Gerischer, H.; Bull. soc. chim. Belges (1958) 67, 506-27.
- Observation of Differently Reacting Valence and Conduction Band Carriers (Max-Planck-Inst. Metallforschung, Stuttgart, 1959) “Oxidation-reduction processes in germanium electrodes.”Beck, F.; Gerischer, H.; Z. Elektrochem.(1959) 63, 943-50.
- Relating Band Positions to Electrode Kinetics (Max-Planck-Inst. Metallforsch., Stuttgart, 1960) “Kinetics of oxidation-reduction reactions on metals and semiconductors. I &II General remarks on the electron transition between a solid body and a reduction-oxidation electrolyte.” Gerischer, H.; Z. physik. Chem. (1960) 26, 223-47; 325-38; (1961) 27, 48-79.
- On the use of single crystal electrodes (Techn. Hochsch. Munich, 1963) “Preparation of spherical single crystal electrodes for use in electrocrystallization studies." Roe, D.K., Gerischer H.; J. Electrochem. Soc.(1963) 110, 350-352.
- Role of Surface States in Electron Transfer at Semiconductor-Solution Interfaces (Tech. Hochsch., Munich, 1967) “Surface activity in redox reactions on semiconductors.” Gerischer, H.; Wallem Mattes; I. Zeitschrift für Physikalische Chemie (1967) 52,60-72.
- Dye Photosensitization of Zinc Oxide (Tech. Hochsch., Munich,1969) “Electrochemical studies on the mechanism of sensitization and supersensitization of zinc oxide single crystals.” Tributsch, H.; Gerischer, H.; Berichte der Bunsen-Gesellschaft (1969) 73,251-60. “Use of semiconductor electrodes in the study of photochemical reactions.” Tributsch, H.; Gerischer, H.; Berichte der Bunsen-Gesellschaft(1969)73,850-4.
- Electrochemistry of electronically excited states (Fritz-Haber-Institut der MPG, 1973) "Elektrodenreaktionen mit angeregten elektronischen Zuständen.“ Gerischer, H.; Ber. Bunsenges. Phys. Chem. (1973) 77, 284-288.
- Semiconductor Photodecomposition (Fritz-Haber-Institut der MPG, 1977 “On the stability of semiconductor electrodes against photodecomposition”. Gerischer H. J. Electroanal. Chem. (1977) 82, 133-143.
- Relating Fermi Levels to Redox Potentials (Fritz-Haber-Inst., Max-Planck-Ges., Berlin, 1983)“Fermi levels in electrolytes and the absolute scale of redox potentials.“ Gerischer, H.; Ekardt, W.; Appl. Phy.s Lett.(1983) 43, 393-5.
