= Martin Suhm =

German physical chemist, spectroscopist

Martin A. Suhm
- Born: 1962; Gengenbach, BRD
- Education: Karlsruhe Institute of Technology
- Scientific career
- Fields: physical chemistry, vibrational spectroscopy
- Workplaces: ETH Zurich; University of Göttingen
- Doctoral advisor: Martin Quack

Martin A. Suhm (born 1962), is a German chemist and spectroscopist; he completed a Ph.D. thesis on the far infrared spectroscopy at ETH Zürich (group of Martin Quack) in 1990; he is a professor at the Institute of Physical Chemistry of the University of Göttingen since 1997 who is active in the field of intermolecular interactions studies; he was elected a member of the Academy of Sciences Leopoldina in 2012.

== Works ==
- Horizons in hydrogen bond research 2009. A collection of papers from the XVIIIth International Conference «Horizons in hydrogen bond research», Paris, France, 14–18 September 2009 / eds. Austin J. Barnes, Marie-Claire Bellissent-Funel, Martin A. Suhm. — Amsterdam, 2010.

== Awards ==
- Latsis University prize (1995)
- ADUC habilitation prize (1995)

== See also ==
- Roman M. Balabin
- Stefan Grimme

== Sources ==
- "Prof. Dr. Martin Suhm". leopoldina.org (in German). Academy of Sciences Leopoldina. 2012.

== Literature ==
- "A profile of Professor Martin Suhm". Physical Chemistry Chemical Physics. 8 (40). Royal Society of Chemistry (RSC): 4605. 2006. Bibcode:2006PCCP....8.4605.. doi:10.1039/b614040h. ISSN 1463-9076.
