= Fritz Haber Institute of the Max Planck Society =

German catalysis research institute

Coordinates: 52°26′54.6″N 13°16′58.8″E

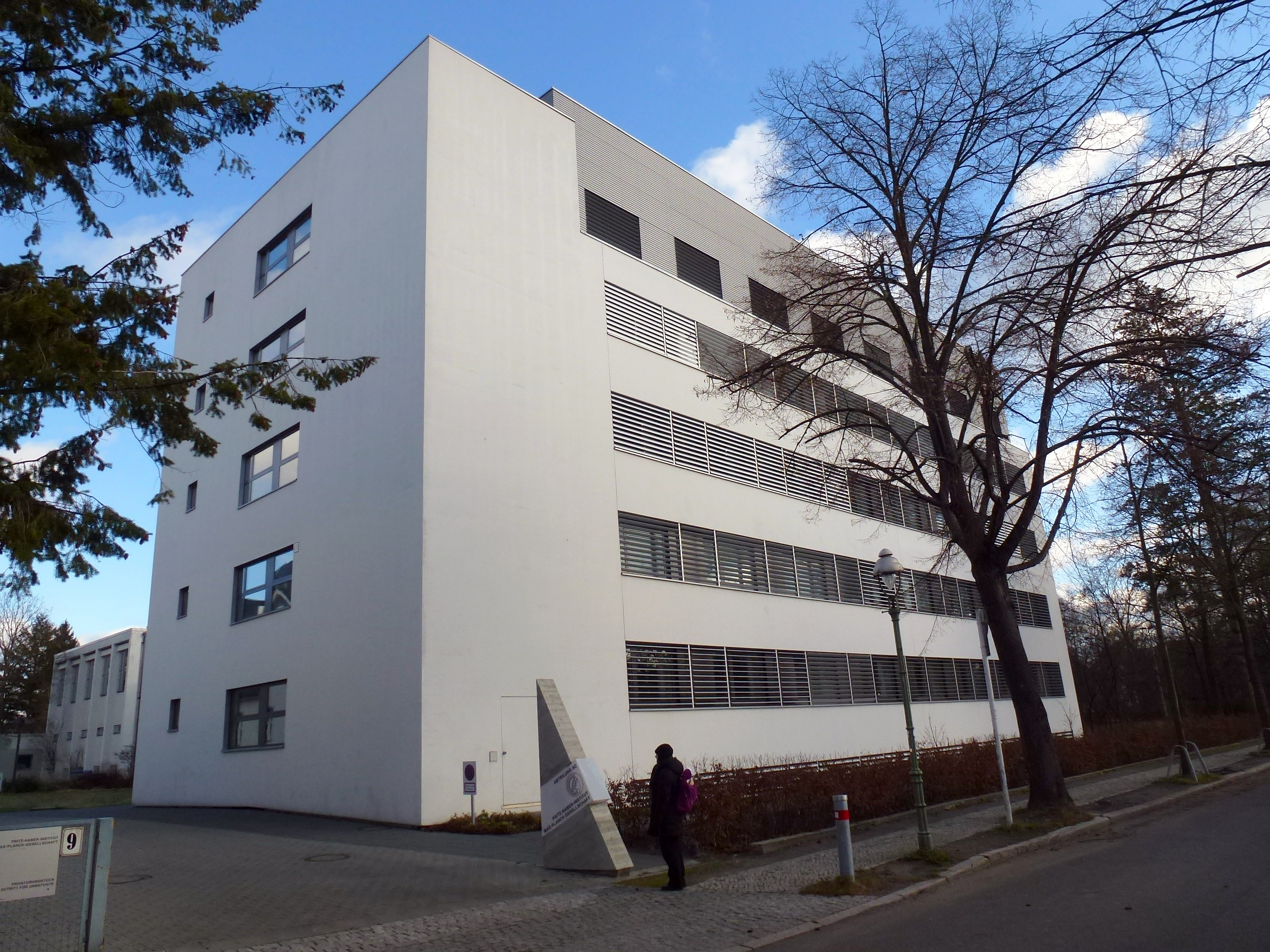
Berlin-Dahlem, Van't-Hoff-Straße, Fritz-Haber-Institut

The Fritz Haber Institute of the Max Planck Society (FHI) is a science research institute located at the heart of the academic district of Dahlem, in Berlin, Germany.

The original Kaiser Wilhelm Institute for Physical Chemistry and Electrochemistry, founded in 1911, was incorporated into the Max Planck Society and simultaneously renamed for its first director, Fritz Haber, in 1953.

The research topics covered throughout the history of the institute include chemical kinetics and reaction dynamics, colloid chemistry, atomic physics, spectroscopy, surface chemistry and surface physics, chemical physics and molecular physics, theoretical chemistry, and materials science.

During World War I and World War II, the research of the institute was directed towards Germany's military needs.

To the illustrious past members of the Institute belong Herbert Freundlich, James Franck, Paul Friedlander, Rudolf Ladenburg, Michael Polanyi, Eugene Wigner, Ladislaus Farkas, Hartmut Kallmann, Otto Hahn, Robert Havemann, Karl Friedrich Bonhoeffer, Iwan N. Stranski, Ernst Ruska, Max von Laue, Gerhard Borrmann, Rudolf Brill, Kurt Moliere, Jochen Block, Heinz Gerischer, Rolf Hosemann, Kurt Ueberreiter, Alexander Bradshaw, Elmar Zeitler, and Gerhard Ertl.

Nobel Prize laureates affiliated with the institute include Max von Laue (1914), Fritz Haber (1918), James Franck (1925), Otto Hahn (1944), Eugene Wigner (1963), Ernst Ruska (1986), Gerhard Ertl (2007).

== Structure ==
There are five departments with a number of research groups within:

=== Current department ===
- Inorganic Chemistry (Beatriz Roldán Cuenya (interim))
  - Reactivity (Annette Trunschke)
  - Electronic Structure (Axel Knop-Gericke)
  - Liquid/vapor Interfaces (Hendrik Bluhm)
  - Electron Microscopy (Thomas Lunkenbein)
- Interface Science (Beatriz Roldán Cuenya)
  - Liquid Phase Electron Microscopy (See Wee Chee)
  - Scanning Probe Microscopy (Markus Heyde)
  - Photo-Electrochemical Scanning Probe Microscopy (Christopher Kley)
  - Thin Films (Helmut Kuhlenbeck)
  - Structure and Reactivity (Shamil Shaikhutdinov)
  - Spectro-Microscopy (Thomas Schmidt)
  - Operando Hard X-ray Spectroscopy (Janis Timoshenko)
  - Interfacial Ionics (Sebastian Oener)
  - Metal-Organic Interfaces (Juan J. Navarro)
  - Electrode-Electrolyte Interfaces (Mariana Monteiro)
  - Dynamics at Electrocatalytic Interfaces (Arno Bergmann)
- Molecular Physics (Gerard Meijer)
  - Controlled Molecules (Sandra Eibenberger-Arias)
  - Spectroscopy and chemistry of metal clusters and cluster complexes (André Fielicke)
  - Interactions of molecules with fields (Bretislav Friedrich)
  - Infrared excitation of gas-phase molecules and clusters (Gert von Helden)
  - Cold and ultracold molecules (Stefan Truppe)
  - Liquid microjets (Bernd Winter)
- Physical Chemistry (Martin Wolf)
  - Atomic-Scale Microscopy and Spectroscopy (Akitoshi Shiotari)
  - Dynamics of Correlated Materials (Laurenz Rettig)
  - Lattice Dynamics (Alex Paarmann)
  - Nonlinear Chemical Imaging (Alexander Fellows)
  - Nonlinear Interfacial Spectroscopy (Martin Thämer)
  - Ultrafast Core Level Spectroscopy (Ugaitz Elu)
  - Structural & Electronic Surface Dynamics (Ralph Ernstorfer)
  - Ultrafast Scanning Probe Microscopy (Melanie Müller)
  - THz Structural Dynamics (Sebastian Maehrlein)
- Theory (Karsten Reuter)
  - Data-Efficient Chemical Machine Learning (Johannes Margraf)
  - Multiscale Modeling from Electrons to the Reactor (Sebastian Matera)
  - First-principles modeling of solid-liquid interfaces and electrocatalysis (Nicolas Hörmann)
  - Understanding of functional solid-solid interfaces at the atomistic level (Christoph Scheurer)
  - Interatomic machine learning potentials for energy materials (Hendrik Heenen)
  - Selectivity in catalysis (Vanessa Jane Bukas)

=== Former department ===
- Theory (Matthias Scheffler)
  - Unifying Concepts in Catalysis (Sergey Levchenko)
  - Heat and Charge Transport (Christian Carbogno)
  - Ab Initio Biomolecular Simulations (Carsten Baldauf)
  - Simulations from Ab Initio Approaches: Structure and Dynamics from Quantum Mechanics (Mariana Rossi)
  - Big-Data Analytics for Materials Science (Luca M. Ghiringhelli)
  - Crystal-Structure Prediction and Heterogeneous Catalysis (Matthias Scheffler)
  - Max Planck Fellow Group (Claudia Draxl)
  - Max Planck Partner Group for Advanced Electronic-Structure Methods (Xinguo Ren)
