= Thomson Medal =

Thomson Medal may refer to:

- Thomson Medal Award from the International Mass Spectrometry Foundation
- Thomson Medal (Royal Society of New Zealand) from the Royal Society of New Zealand
- Institute of Physics Joseph Thomson Medal and Prize
- J. J. Thomson IET Achievement Medal
