= Włodzimierz Kołos =

Polish chemist and physicist (1928–1996)

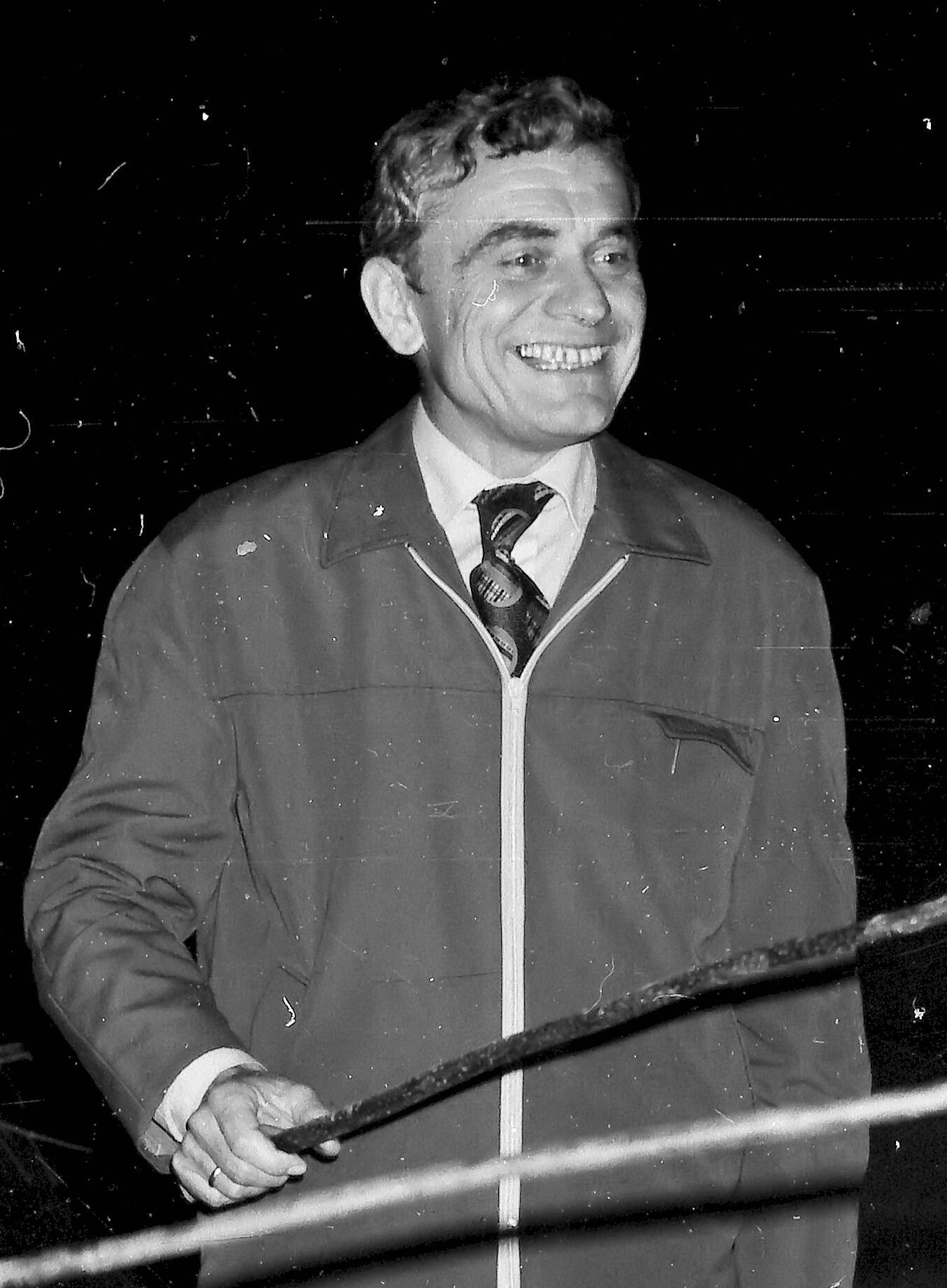
- Włodzimierz Kołos during the School of Advanced Methods of Quantum Chemistry, Bachotek (Poland), June 1976
- Born: September 6, 1928; Pinsk
- Died: June 3, 1996 (aged 67)
- Known for: work on the theory of electron correlation in molecules

Włodzimierz Kołos (1928 - 1996) was a Polish chemist and physicist who was one of the founders of modern quantum chemistry, and pioneered accurate calculations on the electronic structure of molecules.

== Life and scientific work ==
Kołos was born on September 6, 1928, in Pinsk. He received his M.Sc. in chemistry in 1950 and began his academic career as an organic chemist. However, he was soon attracted to theoretical physics. He began his graduate studies in theoretical physics in 1951 and completed his thesis in only two years. The University of Warsaw and the Polish Chemical Society award the Kołos Medal every two years to commemorate his life and career.

Kołos is best known for his work on the theory of electron correlation in molecules. In 1958 he went the University of Chicago, at a time when powerful computers were first becoming available for scientific work. He developed a new computer program to solve the Schrödinger equation for the hydrogen molecule to unprecedented accuracy. In the early 1960s, Kołos and Wolniewicz published a number of pioneering papers on the potential energy curves of the hydrogen molecule, including several corrections to the Born–Oppenheimer approximation, including adiabatic, non-adiabatic, and relativistic terms. One result attracted particular attention: the calculated dissociation energy disagreed with the best experimental data then available, from Gerhard Herzberg’s group. A few years later Herzberg improved his experiment and obtained a new result that agreed with the theoretical prediction. This was the first time that quantum mechanical calculations on a molecule had proved more accurate than the best experiments. Herzberg himself emphasized the importance of this in his Nobel Prize lecture.

Kołos established a strong research group in molecular quantum chemistry in Warsaw, and made many other important contributions, particularly in the field of intermolecular forces. He made important contributions to the development of the symmetry-adapted perturbation theory of intermolecular forces and carried out pioneering studies on the nonadditivity of intermolecular forces. He was a member of the Polish Academy of Sciences, the International Academy of Quantum Molecular Science and the Academia Europaea.

== Awards and recognition ==
- Sniadecki Medal
- Copernicus Medal
- Medal of the Israel Academy of Sciences and Humanities
- Alexander von Humboldt Award
- Jurzykowski Prize
- Swietoslawski Award
- Annual Medal of the International Academy of Quantum Molecular Science
- Honorary doctorate of the Adam Mickiewicz University
