= Quantum crystallography =

Quantum crystallography is a branch of crystallography that investigates crystalline materials within the framework of quantum mechanics, with analysis and representation, in position or in momentum space, of quantities like wave function, electron charge and spin density, density matrices and all properties related to them (like electric potential, electric or magnetic moments, energy densities, electron localization function, one electron potential, etc.). Like the quantum chemistry, Quantum crystallography involves both experimental and computational work. The theoretical part of quantum crystallography is based on quantum mechanical calculations of atomic/molecular/crystal wave functions, density matrices or density models, used to simulate the electronic structure of a crystalline material. While in quantum chemistry, the experimental works mainly rely on spectroscopy, in quantum crystallography the scattering techniques (X-rays, neutrons, γ-Rays, electrons) play the central role, although spectroscopy as well as atomic microscopy are also sources of information.

The connection between crystallography and quantum chemistry has always been very tight, after X-ray diffraction techniques became available in crystallography. In fact, the scattering of radiation enables mapping the one-electron distribution or the elements of a density matrix. The kind of radiation and scattering determines the quantity which is represented (electron charge or spin) and the space in which it is represented (position or momentum space). Although the wave function is typically assumed not to be directly measurable, recent advances enable also to compute wave functions that are restrained to some experimentally measurable observable (like the scattering of a radiation).

The term Quantum Crystallography was first introduced in revisitation articles by L. Huang, L. Massa and Nobel Prize winner Jerome Karle, who associated it with two mainstreams: a) crystallographic information that enhances quantum mechanical calculations and b) quantum mechanical approaches to improve crystallography information. This definition mainly refers to studies started in the 1960s and 1970s, when first attempts to obtain wave functions from scattering experiments appeared, together with other methods to constrain a wavefunction to experimental observations like the dipole moment. This field has been recently reviewed, within the context of this definition.

Parallel to studies on wave function determination, R. F. Stewart and P. Coppens investigated the possibilities to compute models for one-electron charge density from X-ray scattering (for example by means of pseudoatoms multipolar expansion), and later of spin density from polarized neutron diffraction, that originated the scientific community of charge, spin and momentum density. In a recent review article, V. Tsirelson gave a more general definition: "Quantum crystallography is a research area exploiting the fact that parameters of quantum-mechanically valid electronic model of a crystal can be derived from the accurately measured set of X-ray coherent diffraction structure factors".

The book Modern Charge Density Analysis offers a survey of the research involving Quantum Crystallography and of the most adopted experimental or theoretical methodologies.

The International Union of Crystallography has recently established a commission on Quantum Crystallography, as extension of the previous commission on Charge, Spin and Momentum density, with the purpose of coordinating research activities in this field.
