= Boron porphyrins =

Boron porphyrins are a variety of porphyrin, a common macrocycle used for photosensitization and metal trapping applications, that incorporate boron. The central four nitrogen atoms in a porphyrin macrocycle form a unique molecular pocket which is known to accommodate transition metals of various sizes and oxidation states. Due to the diversity of binding modes available to porphyrin, there is a growing interest in introducing other elements (i.e. main group elements) into this pocket.

Boron in particular has been shown to prefer binding to porphyrin in a 2:1 stoichiometry, primarily due to its small atomic radius, but the Group XIII element will bind in a 1:1 ratio with corrole, a macromolecule with a structure similar to porphyrin but with a smaller N_{4} pocket.

Boron porphyrins are of interest because of the unique geometric environment to which both boron and porphyrin are subjected upon B-N_{(pyrrole)} bond formation. These new geometric motifs lead to novel reactivity, one of the most surprising examples being sterically-induced reductive coupling. Possible applications for boron porphyrins include BNCT delivery agents and OLED devices.

Also of interest are molecules containing both boron and porphyrin moieties, but without B-N_{(pyrrole)} bonds. Examples include diketonate-porphyrin compounds and dyads (two-component molecules) containing the classic BODIPY dye.

== Synthesis ==
Boron porphyrins first appeared in the literature during the 1960's and 1970's, in initially available literature the complex was never well characterized. The Boron porphyrin compounds can be synthesized either from the free base porphyrin or from a lithium porphyrin complex as starting material. Two representative examples are shown here. The first is the porphyrin free base reacted with BX_{3} in the presence of water.

The second is Li_{2}(ttp) reacted with BX_{3}. The (BX_{2})_{2}(por) can undergo reduction to form a B-B bond and eliminate X_{2}, giving (BX)_{2}(por). From here, the halides can be replaced with BuLi to give (B-Bu)_{2}(por), reacted with alcohols to give (B-OR)_{2}(por), or even undergo halogen abstraction via weakly-coordinating anions to give [(B-B)(por)]^{2+}.

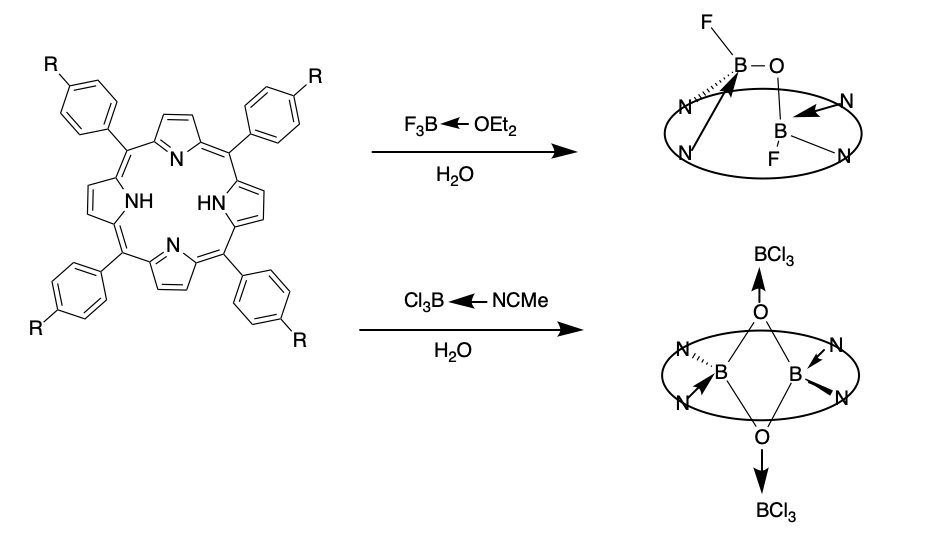
Free base porphyrin gives different products with LBX_{3} depending on which L is involved. For L= diethyl ether, an O(BF)_{2} unit results, whereas when L= acetonitrile, a four-membered B_{2}O_{2} ring is formed.

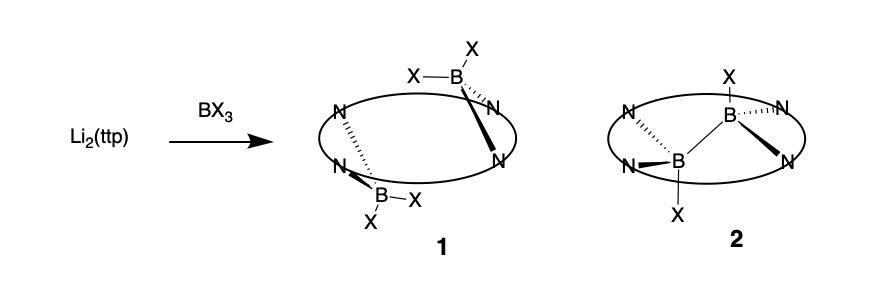
Synthesis of halogenated boron porphyrin compounds. For X=F, Cl, the major product is 1. For X=Cl, 1 can be reduced with metallic sodium to give 2. For X=Br, a mixture of 1 and 2 result. For X=I, the major product is 2.

== Geometry ==
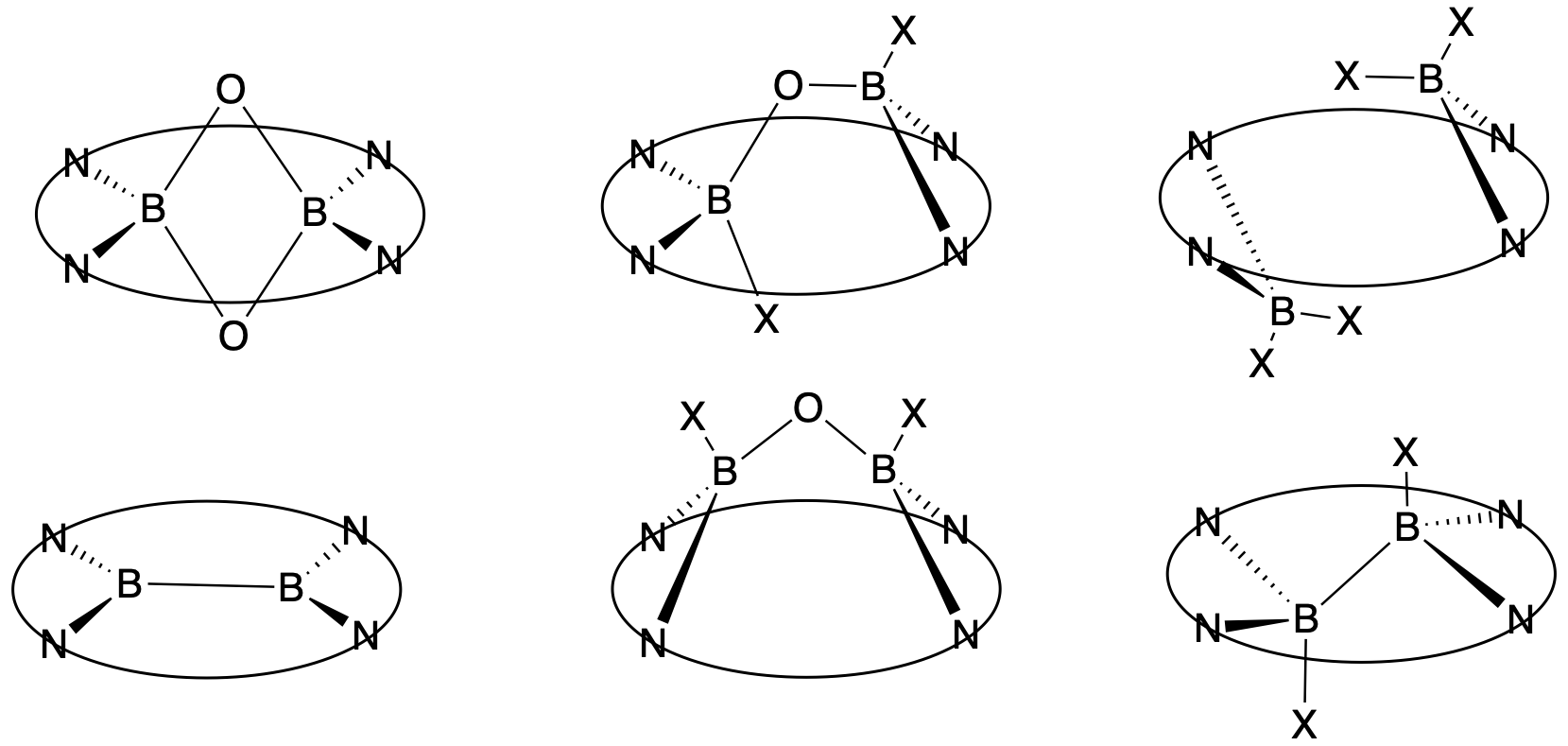
Possibilities for boron porphyrin: coplanar with the N_{4} plane, one in/one out of plane, both out cisoid, both out transoid

One of the major differences between p-block-element-centered porphyrins and transition-metal-centered porphyrins is the far smaller size of the interstitial atom, especially in the case of the first-row p-block. Other than protons, the next smallest atom known to bind to the central N_{4} pocket is lithium. The first two isolated lithium porphyrin complexes each reported a 2:1 metal to base ratio, and XRD suggested both lithium atoms reside out of the porphyrin plane.

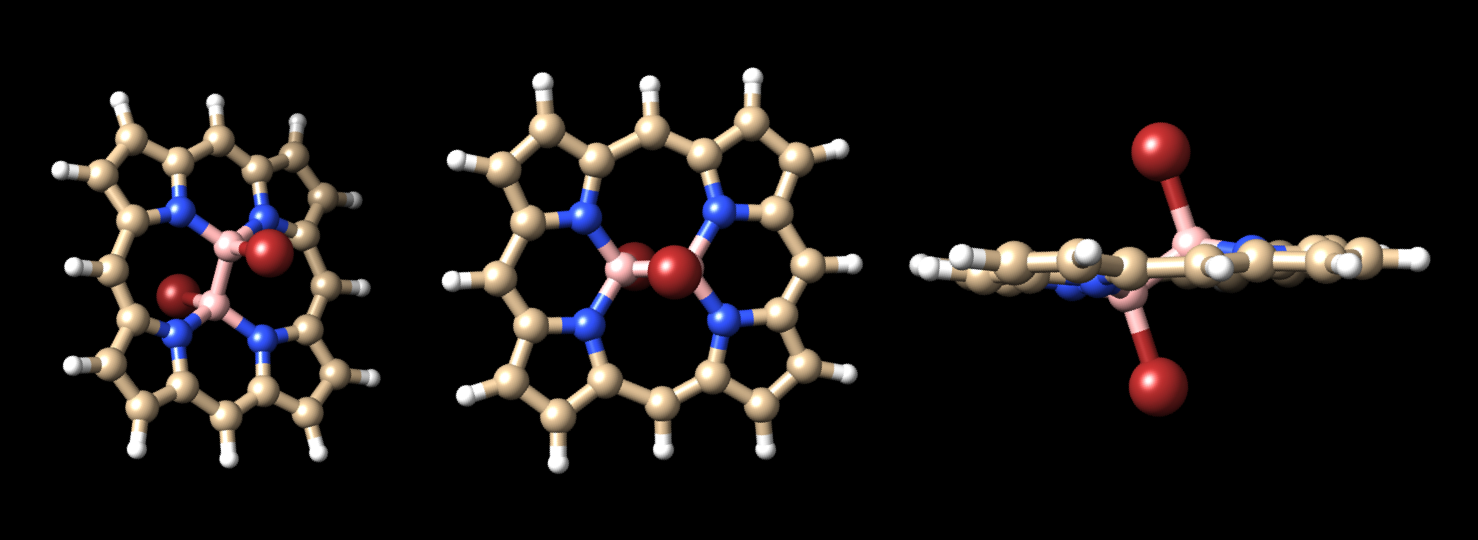
The computed structure of (BCl)_{2}(por) gives a B-B bond length of 1.74 Å, a tetragonal porphyrin elongation of 0.84 Å. The halides adopt a transoid configuration and both boron atoms are slightly displaced from the porphyrin plane.

Boron has a covalent radius of 85 pm, significantly smaller than lithium's 133 pm. This suggests the porphyrin pocket is more likely to accommodate two boron atoms rather than one. Indeed, each boron porphyrin synthesized thus far has adopted a ratio of 2:1, with a range of orientations relative to the N_{4} plane. The boron atoms can exist in the same plane as the porphyrin (both with and without additional out-of-plane B-X bonds), or out of N_{4} plane in either a cisoid or transoid geometry.

This coordination motif is interesting because it introduces both boron and porphyrin to geometries they do not regularly adopt. Porphyrin readily binds to transition metals, which are capable of octahedral or square planar geometries. Boron, without available d-orbitals, typically adopts a trigonal planar or tetrahedral local bonding environment. Diboryl porphyrins, on the other hand, find boron in a pseudo-tetrahedral local environment and introduce a tetragonal distortion to the porphyrin, as can be seen in the DFT image above.

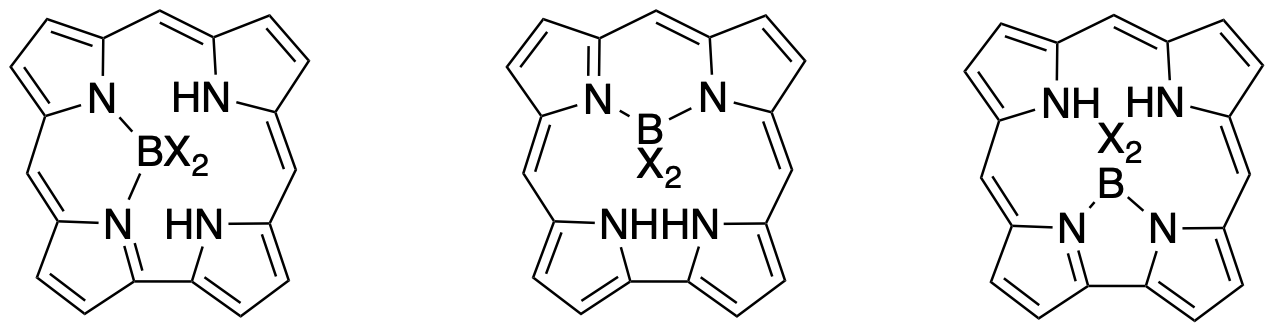
Corrole binding modes. Left to right: dipyrromethene (A), dipyrromethene (B), bipyrrole (C)

Corroles are distinct from porphyrins in that they contain one less methine to bridge between pyrrole units, creating a lower-symmetry compound and a smaller N_{4} pocket. For boron chemistry, this slightly smaller core allows for the possibility of binding to a single boron, whereas the porphyrin pocket has thus far always bound two. For such monoboryl corroles, DFT studies have suggested the boron preferentially binds to the dipyrromethene (A) site shown here, in which stability is attained by maximizing both BX—HN hydrogen bonding and BH—HN dihydrogen bonding, in addition to minimizing steric crowding.

The Brothers group has shown the stereochemical implications of comparing diboryl porphyrin with diboryl corrole: porphyrin prefers transoid orientation of the diboryl unit, whereas corrole prefers the cisoid orientation.

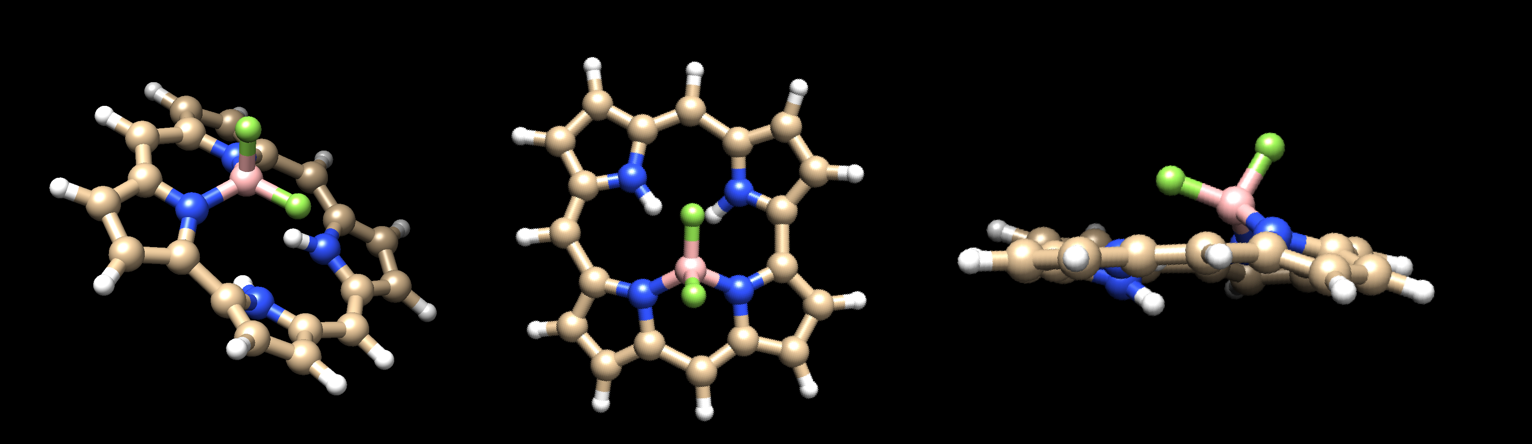
BF_{2}(H_{2}cor) with an out-of-plane boron bound to a dipyrromethene unit within corrole.

== Non-central boron-porphyrin interactions ==
Two examples of boron-containing compounds that have been linked to porphyrin are BODIPY and diketonate.

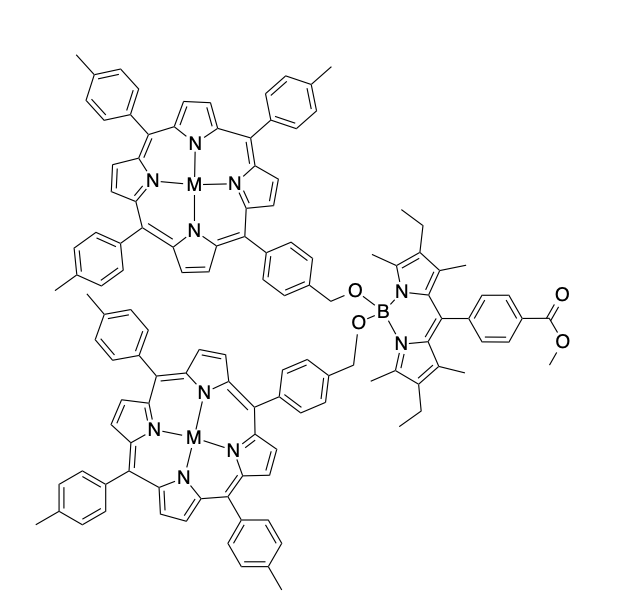
A second example of a porphyrin-BODIPY chromophore, where M = Zn.

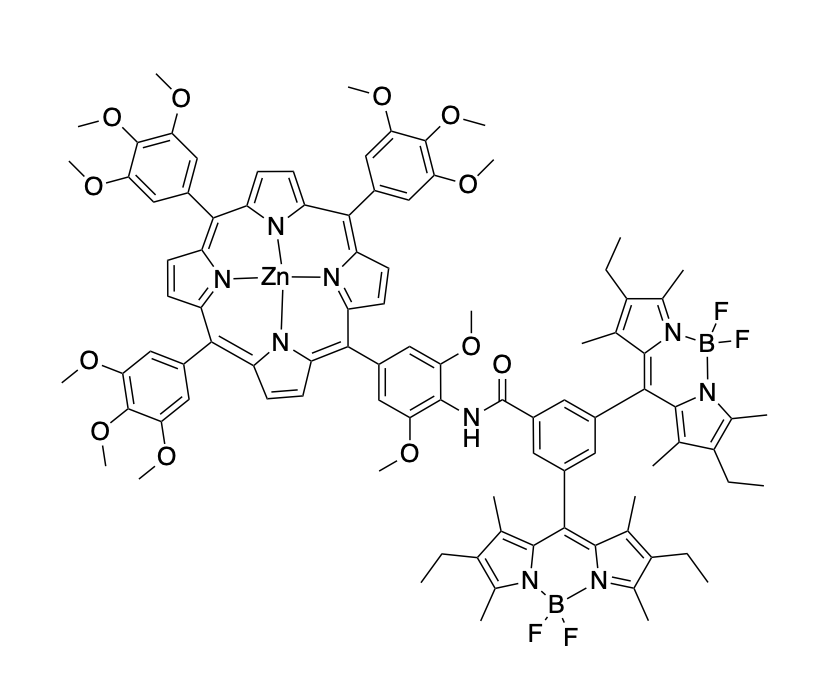
One example of a porphyrin-BODIPY chromophore.

The BODIPY chromophore acts as an antenna: it absorbs a broad range of UV-visible light, then emits at a wavelength compatible with porphyrin absorption, allowing for efficient energy transfer.

This work has been extended to triads and to porphyrins with various core transition metals, some displaying multiphoton excitation.

On the other hand, when boron difluoride β-diketonate is used for an antenna, the emission-absorption overlap is small and little change in the porphyrin's optical properties is observed. Though this chromophore is preferable to BODIPY in certain applications, it is not an effective antenna for porphyrin.

== Reactivity ==
=== Reduction ===
One consequence of geometric strain on both the boron and the porphyrin moieties is unique reactivity. The Brothers group was able to demonstrate reductive coupling, wherein two BX_{2} units inside the porphyrin pocket become X-B-B-X, only occurs with X=Br and when the substrates are within the porphyrin pocket. DFT calculations show that for X=Cl or F, the reaction is endothermic and non-spontaneous. However, for X=Br, the reduction is spontaneous, which was consistent with experimental findings. Further, when the same reaction is simulated with two porphyrin halves ((dipyrromethene)BX_{2}), it is non-spontaneous even for X=Br, suggesting the steric strain of the porphyrin ring to be the driving force behind the reduction reaction.

=== Hydrolysis ===
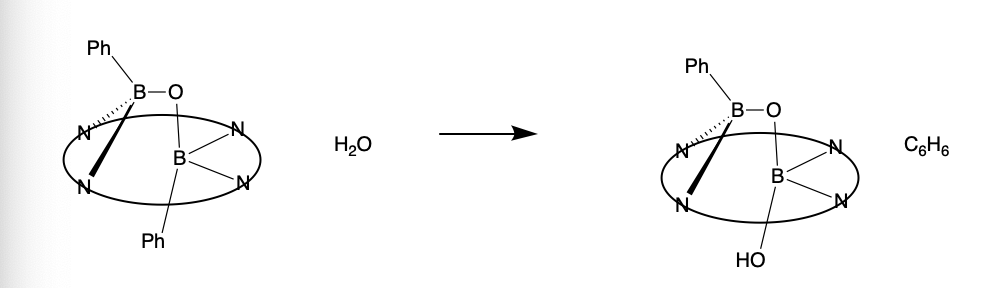
Hydrolysis of [B_{2}O(Ph)_{2}(por)] is endergonic. Steric crowding prefers substitution at the in-plane boron over the out-of-plane boron.

Hydrolysis is one of the primary reactions to occur in diboryl porphyrin complexes. In this reaction, RBOBR(por) reacts with water to exchange a B-OH bond for a B-R bond, liberating the R group.

Hydrolysis products are important intermediates in the synthesis of the B-O-B(por) compounds from BX_{2}(por) compounds. In fact, simply performing column chromatography on (BF_{2})_{2}(por) on silica gives the partial hydrolysis product B_{2}OF_{2}(por).

DFT computations show that hydrolysis, as in the scheme shown here, is energetically favorable (breaking of a relatively weak B-C bond, formation of a strong B-O bond, formation of benzene). However, only one of the two phenyl groups is observed to undergo hydrolysis. This suggests thermodynamic favorability is not the only factor at play. Rather, as Belcher et al. suggest, there is a significant steric component to this reaction. The boron in the porphyrin ring plane undergoes substitution, while the out-of-plane boron retains its phenyl bond.

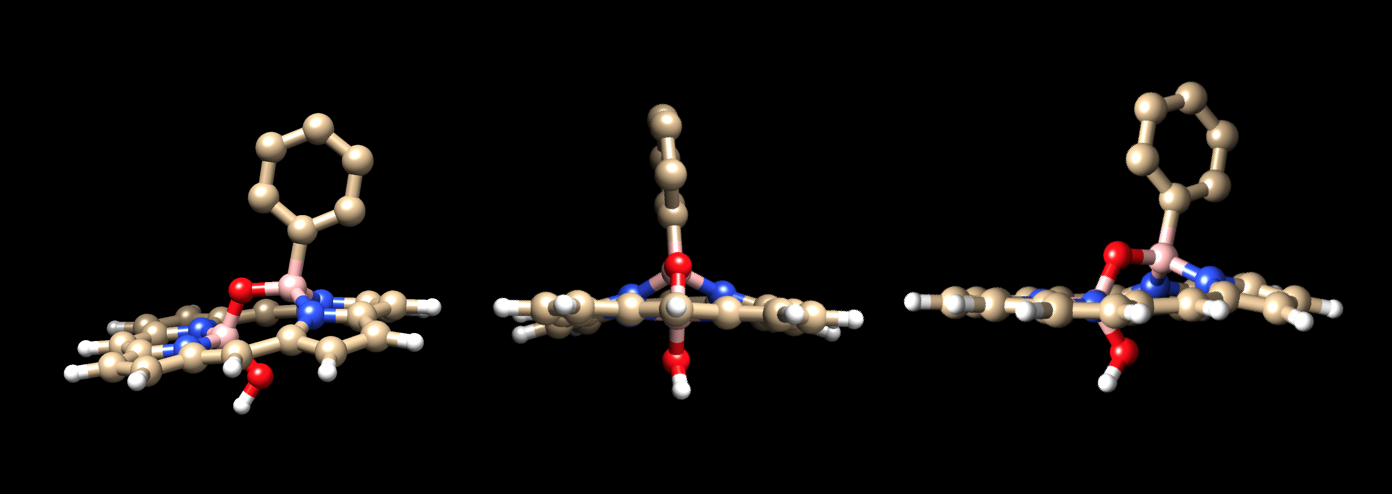
Optimized structure of B_{2}O(Ph)(OH)(porphine), where the phenyl and hydroxy groups adopt a trans conformation and the phenyl-bound boron rests 1.21 A out of the average porphine plane.

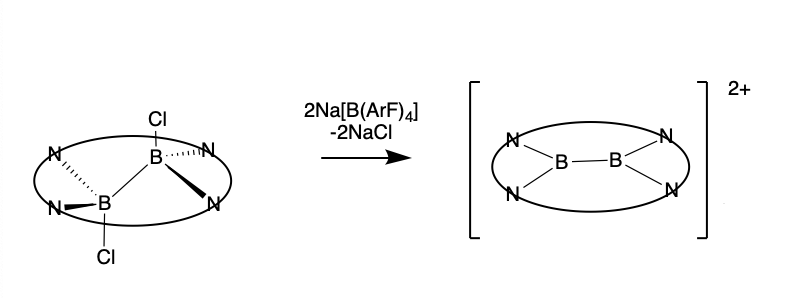
The X-B-B-X fragment within a diboryl porphyrin can undergo halogen abstraction, giving [B-B](por)^{2+} with the B-B bond coplanar to the N_{4} porphyrin ring.

=== Halogen abstraction ===
(Also see Geometry section above for a discussion of the B-B bonding environment.)

Abstraction of halogens with two equivalents of sodium tetrakis[3,5-bis(trifluoromethyl)phenyl]borate gives the dication with both boron atoms within the porphyrin plane. Two reversible reduction waves occur at reduction potentials lower than that of the free base.
