= Richard Bader =

Canadian quantum chemist (1931–2012)

Richard F. W. Bader FRSC FCIC
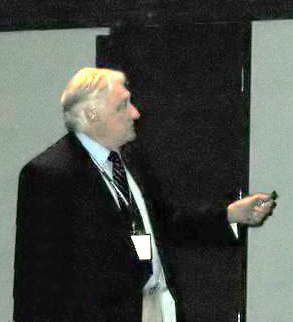
- Born: Richard Frederick William Bader; 15 October 1931; Kitchener, Ontario, Canada
- Died: 15 January 2012 (aged 80)
- Education: McMaster University; Massachusetts Institute of Technology
- Known for: Quantum theory of atoms in molecules
- Awards: Guggenheim Fellowship (1979); Kołos Medal (2000)
- Scientific career
- Workplaces: McMaster University; Cambridge University; University of Ottawa
- Thesis: The origin of isotope effects in light and heavy water (1958)
- Doctoral advisor: C. Gardner-Swain
- Other academic advisors: H. Christopher Longuet-Higgins
- Website: https://chemistry.mcmaster.ca/bader/

Richard F. W. Bader FRSC FCIC (October 15, 1931 – January 15, 2012) was a Canadian quantum chemist, noted for his work on the atoms in molecules theory. This theory attempts to establish a physical basis for many of the working concepts of chemistry, such as atoms in molecules and bonding, in terms of the topology of the electron density function in three-dimensional space. Alongside the eminent chemist Ronald Gillespie, he had a significant influence on inorganic chemistry education in Canada.

He was born in 1931 in Kitchener, Ontario, Canada. His parents were Albert Bader and Alvina Bader, who immigrated from Switzerland. His father was a butcher at Burns Pride of Canada and his mother was a housekeeper at Kitchener Hospital of Waterloo. He received a scholarship from McMaster University that allowed him to earn a BSC in 1953. His father was his best supporter, who encouraged him and taught him to "never quit" his education and his dream. He finished his master's degree in science at McMaster University in 1955. He obtained a PhD (1958) from the Massachusetts Institute of Technology (MIT). He did postdoctoral work at MIT and the University of Cambridge. He was appointed assistant professor in the Department of Chemistry at the University of Ottawa in 1959 and promoted to associate professor in 1962. He moved to McMaster University as an associate professor in 1963, became a full Professor in 1966, and was Emeritus Professor in 1996.

He was elected a Fellow of the Royal Society of Canada in 1980. He was a fellow of the Chemical Institute of Canada. Bader has received the John Simon Guggenheim Memorial Fellowship. Bader was elected a Grand Fellow of the MIRCE Academy, Exeter, UK, in 2010. Over his long career, he published 223 refereed articles and book chapters about chemistry and physics. Bader's works in recent years are cited more than 3000 times per year.

Richard F. W. Bader discovered that electron density is very important in explaining the behavior of atoms in molecules. According to his theory, there are no atomic orbitals in the molecules. This was a new idea and went against accepted theories. He fought hard for his revolutionary ideas and found it difficult to publish. In the end, the theories became more accepted and published a book Atoms in Molecules, a Quantum Theory in 1991. Bader said: 'We had a lot of deep discussions, and it started to occur to me that chemistry was in a real bind because we had this very powerful molecular structure hypothesis that came from the cauldron of experimental physics. But everyone had their own dictionary - different people had a different idea of what a bond was. We were trying to do science with everyone using their own private dictionary. I decided that when I left, I would make it my goal to find the physical basis of chemistry. Bader helped create the widely used software program, AIMPAC, that predicts the properties of molecules based on the atoms in that molecule.

Richard F. W. Bader developed the Quantum Theory of Atoms in Molecules (QTAIM), a real-space formulation of quantum chemistry in which molecules and crystals are partitioned into non-overlapping atomic basins bounded by zero-flux surfaces in the gradient vector field of the electron density. QTAIM provides quantum-mechanical definitions of atoms in molecules, chemical bonding, atomic energies, electron localization and delocalization, and molecular structure based on the partitioning of the observable electron density. Bader’s work introduced concepts such as bond paths, virial paths, bond critical points, atomic virial theorems, localization and delocalization indices, and the treatment of atoms as open quantum sub-systems, with a number of applications in chemistry, crystallography, materials science, and chemical biology. QTAIM is a principal tool for the topological analysis of electron density in both theoretical and experimental chemistry, particularly in X-ray crystallography and charge-density analysis. Bader argued that chemistry should be formulated directly in terms of measurable physical fields such as the electron density and current density, replacing heuristic orbital-based models with a real-space description of matter grounded in quantum mechanics. Bader also made important early contributions to reaction theory and molecular vibrations. In his 1981 Nobel Lecture, Kenichi Fukui specifically acknowledged Bader’s pioneering work on symmetry rules governing vibrational perturbations and reaction pathways, stating that “the important theory of Bader ... specified the mode of decomposition of a molecule or a transition complex by means of the symmetry of the normal vibration”.

Bader married Pamela Kozenof, a nurse from New Zealand, in 1958. They had three daughters, Carolyn, Kimberly and Suzanne. He had one grandson, Alexander.
