= Carla Faria =

Brazilian physicist

Carla Figueira de Morisson Faria
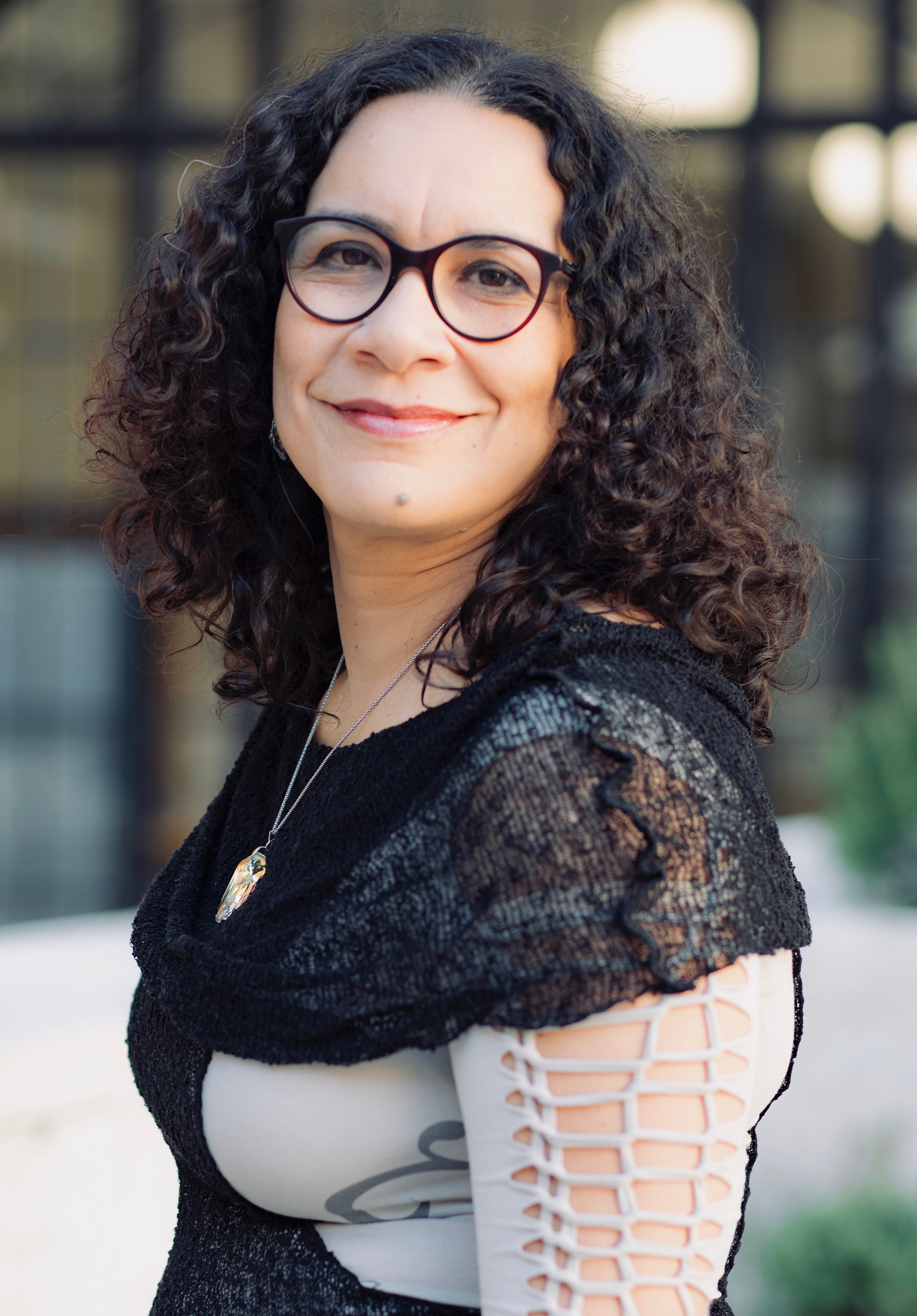
- Education: University of São Paulo; Max Born Institut
- Scientific career
- Fields: Attophysics, Mathematical physics, Optics
- Workplaces: Max Planck Institute; Max Born Institut; Vienna University of Technology; Leibniz University Hannover; City University of London; University College London
- Thesis: Interaction of Atoms with Intense Laser Fields and Ultrashort Pulses (1999)
- Website: https://www.uclatto.com

Carla Figueira De Morisson Faria is a Brazilian physicist and professor at University College London. She works on theoretical strong-field laser-matter interactions.

== Early life and education ==
Faria is from Belém. She studied physics at the University of São Paulo. She worked with Vanderlei Bagnato on cold matter and atom trapping. Her masters dissertation considered magneto-optical traps. She joined the Max Born Institute for Nonlinear Optics and Short Pulse Spectroscopy in Berlin, where she was supervised by Wolfgang Sandner. Faria joined the Max Planck Institute for Physics in 1999. She held postdoctoral positions at TU Wien, Leibniz University Hannover and Max Born Institute. Her early work considered the time profiles of high harmonic generation.

== Research and career ==
Faria joined City University of London as a Research Fellow in 2005 and was made an EPSRC Advanced Lecturer in 2006. She contributed to the 2007 book Progress in Ultrafast Intense Laser Science II. In 2007 she moved to University College London. She is a member of the Atomic, Molecular, Optical and Positron Physics group. Her research considers laser fields that have stronger intensities than 10^{13} Wcm^{−2}. At these intensities, there is laser-induced scattering of electrons with their parent ions. Faria studies the temporal and spatial interference of these. She uses strong-laser physics in solid-state electronic devices, in plasma physics and as X-ray sources. She was made a Professor of Physics in October 2018.

== Awards ==
In 2021, Faria was awarded the Joseph Thomson Medal and Prize for her "contributions to the theory of strong-field laser-matter interactions".

She was named as a 2025 Fellow of Optica, "for outstanding and sustained contributions to the theory of laser-matter interaction, and for extraordinary and innovative outreach efforts".

== Selected publications ==
- C. Figueira de Morisson Faria, X. Liu. 2011. Electron–electron correlation in strong laser fields. Journal of Modern Optics 59:8, pages 679-685. doi:10.1080/09500340.2010.543958.
- C. Figueira de Morisson Faria, H. Schomerus, W Becker. 2002. High-order above-threshold ionization: The uniform approximation and the effect of the binding potential. Phys. Rev. A 66, 043413. doi:10.1103/PhysRevA.66.043413.
- C. Figueira de Morisson Faria, Andreas Fring. 2006. Time evolution of non-Hermitian Hamiltonian systems. J. Phys. A: Math. Gen. 39 9269. doi:10.1088/0305-4470/39/29/018.
- C. Figueira de Morisson Faria, Henning Schomerus, X. Liu, W. Becker. 2004. Electron-electron dynamics in laser-induced nonsequential double ionization. Phys. Rev. A 69, 043405. doi:10.1103/PhysRevA.69.043405.
