= Kołos Medal =

- Awarded for: achievements in theoretical or experimental physical chemistry
- Country: Poland
- Presented by: University of Warsaw and Polish Chemical Society
- Reward: $2000
- First award: 1998

The Kołos Medal (Polish: Medal im. Włodzimierza Kołosa) is a medal awarded every two years by the University of Warsaw and the Polish Chemical Society for distinction in theoretical or experimental physical chemistry. It was established in 1998 to commemorate the life and career of Włodzimierz Kołos, one of the founding fathers of modern quantum chemistry.

The medal features the picture of Kołos, his date of birth and death, the Latin inscriptions Societas Chimica Polonorum, Universitas Varsoviensis and Servire Veritatis Kołos Lectio Praemiumque as well as the name of the recipient.

== Recipients ==
The winners of the award so far have been:

Year	Name	Country
2024	Anna Krylov	United States / Israel / Russia
2022	Jacek Klinowski	Poland
2017	Walter Thiel	Germany
2015	Frederic Merkt	Switzerland
2013	Philip Coppens	United States
2011	Y. T. Lee	Taiwan
2009	Joachim Sauer	Germany
2007	Jeremy M. Hutson	United Kingdom
2005	Jan Peter Toennies	United States
2002	Paul von Ragué Schleyer	United States
2000	Richard Bader	Canada
1998	Roald Hoffmann	United States

Source: Warsaw University

== See also ==
- List of chemistry awards
