= Edward Hinds =

British physicist

Professor Edward Allen Hinds FRS
- Born: 8 September 1949 (age 76)
- Citizenship: British
- Education: Jesus College, Oxford
- Known for: cold matter (physics)
- Awards: Humboldt Prize (1998); FRS (2004); Rumford Medal (2008); Thomson Medal (2008); Bakerian Medal (2019)
- Scientific career
- Fields: Physics
- Workplaces: Columbia University; Yale University; SCOAP, University of Sussex; Imperial College London

Edward Allen Hinds FInstP FAPS FRS (born 8 Sept 1949) is a British physicist noted for his work with cold matter.

He was educated at Dame Allan's School in Newcastle before being offered a place at Jesus College, Oxford, where he matriculated in 1968. He obtained both an undergraduate degree and a doctorate before moving to the United States to teach at Columbia University.

He served as professor of physics at Yale University before returning to the United Kingdom in 1994 to start the Sussex Centre for Optical and Atomic Physics at Sussex University.

He is currently (2014) a Royal Society Research Professor and director of the Centre for Cold Matter at Imperial College London, where his research is concentrated on fundamental problems in physics and on new methods for producing and manipulating cold atoms and molecules.

== Honours and awards ==
Source: Imperial College

- Royal Society Bakerian Medal, 2019
- Faraday Medal and Prize, Institute of Physics, 2013
- Rumford Medal, Royal Society, 2008
- Thomson Medal and Prize, Institute of Physics, 2008
- Royal Society Research Professor, Royal Society, 2006
- Fellow of the Royal Society, 2004
- Fellow of the Optical Society of America, 2002
- EPSRC Senior Research Fellow, 1999
- Humboldt Prize, 1998
- Royal Society Leverhulme Trust Senior Research Fellow, 1998
- Fellow of the Institute of Physics, 1996
- Fellow of the American Physical Society, 1994
