= C. Stuart Adams =

British physicist

Charles Stuart Adams is a British physicist and Professor in the Durham University Department of Physics, which he joined in 1995.

He studied at Hertford College, Oxford as an undergraduate, completed an MRes at McMaster University, and received his PhD from the University of Strathclyde.

His main research interest is experimental quantum optics.

Adams was awarded the Joseph Thomson Medal and Prize by the Institute of Physics in 2014. He also received the Fernand Holweck Medal and Prize in 2020 for his experimental studies on light–matter interactions, which have often involved the use of Rydberg atoms.
