= Atoms in molecules =

Quantum chemical model of molecular and condensed matter electronic systems

In quantum chemistry, the quantum theory of atoms in molecules (QTAIM), sometimes referred to as atoms in molecules (AIM), is a model of molecular and condensed matter electronic systems (such as crystals) in which the principal objects of molecular structure - atoms and bonds - are natural expressions of a system's observable electron density distribution function. An electron density distribution of a molecule is a probability distribution that describes the average manner in which the electronic charge is distributed throughout real space in the attractive field exerted by the nuclei. According to QTAIM, molecular structure is revealed by the stationary points of the electron density together with the gradient paths of the electron density that originate and terminate at these points.

QTAIM was primarily developed by Professor Richard Bader and his research group at McMaster University over the course of decades, beginning with analyses of theoretically calculated electron densities of simple molecules in the early 1960s and culminating with analyses of both theoretically and experimentally measured electron densities of crystals in the 90s. The development of QTAIM was driven by the assumption that, since the concepts of atoms and bonds have been and continue to be so ubiquitously useful in interpreting, classifying, predicting and communicating chemistry, they should have a well-defined physical basis.

QTAIM recovers the central operational concepts of the molecular structure hypothesis, that of a functional grouping of atoms with an additive and characteristic set of properties, together with a definition of the bonds that link the atoms and impart the structure. QTAIM defines chemical bonding and structure of a chemical system based on the topology of the electron density. In addition to bonding, QTAIM allows the calculation of certain physical properties on a per-atom basis, by dividing space up into atomic volumes containing exactly one nucleus, which acts as a local attractor of the electron density. In QTAIM an atom is defined as a proper open system, i.e. a system that can share energy and electron density which is localized in the 3D space. The mathematical study of these features is usually referred to in the literature as charge density topology.

QTAIM rests on the fact that the dominant topological property of the vast majority of electron density distributions is the presence of strong maxima that occur exclusively at the nuclei, certain pairs of which are linked together by ridges of electron density. In terms of an electron density distribution's gradient vector field, this corresponds to a complete, non-overlapping partitioning of a molecule into three-dimensional basins (atoms) that are linked together by shared two-dimensional separatrices (interatomic surfaces). Within each interatomic surface, the electron density is a maximum at the corresponding internuclear saddle point, which also lies at the minimum of the ridge between corresponding pair of nuclei, the ridge being defined by the pair of gradient trajectories (bond path) originating at the saddle point and terminating at the nuclei. Because QTAIM atoms are always bounded by surfaces having zero flux in the gradient vector field of the electron density, they have some unique quantum mechanical properties compared to other subsystem definitions. These include unique electronic kinetic energy, the satisfaction of an electronic virial theorem analogous to the molecular electronic virial theorem, and some interesting variational properties. QTAIM has gradually become a method for addressing possible questions regarding chemical systems, in a variety of situations hardly handled before by any other model or theory in chemistry.

== Applications ==
QTAIM is applied to the description of certain organic crystals with unusually short distances between neighboring molecules as observed by X-ray diffraction. For example in the crystal structure of molecular chlorine, the experimental Cl...Cl distance between two molecules is 327 picometres, which is less than the sum of the van der Waals radii of 350 picometres. In one QTAIM result, 12 bond paths start from each chlorine atom to other chlorine atoms including the other chlorine atom in the molecule. The theory also aims to explain the metallic properties of metallic hydrogen in much the same way.

The theory is also applied to so-called hydrogen–hydrogen bonds as they occur in molecules such as phenanthrene and chrysene. In these compounds, the distance between two ortho hydrogen atoms again is shorter than their van der Waals radii, and according to in silico experiments based on this theory, a bond path is identified between them. Both hydrogen atoms have identical electron density and are closed shell and therefore they are very different from the so-called dihydrogen bonds that are postulated for compounds such as H_{3}NBH_{3}, and also different from so-called agostic interactions.

Biphenyl (1), phenanthrene (2), and anthracene (3)

In mainstream chemistry descriptions, close proximity of two nonbonding atoms leads to destabilizing steric repulsion but in QTAIM the observed hydrogen-hydrogen interactions are in fact stabilizing. It is well known that both kinked phenanthrene and chrysene are around 6 kcal/mol (25 kJ/mol) more stable than their linear isomers anthracene and tetracene. One traditional explanation is given by Clar's rule. QTAIM shows that a calculated stabilization of 8 kcal/mol (33 kJ/mol) for phenanthrene is the result of destabilization of the compound by 8 kcal/mol (33 kJ/mol) originating from electron transfer from carbon to hydrogen, offset by 12.1 kcal (51 kJ/mol) of stabilization due to a H...H bond path. The electron density at the critical point between the two hydrogen atoms is low (0.012 e) for phenanthrene. Another property of the bond path is its curvature.

Another molecule analyzed by QTAIM is biphenyl. Its two phenyl ring planes are oriented at a 38° angle with respect to each other, with the planar molecular geometry (resulting from a rotation around the central C-C bond) destabilized by 2.1 kcal/mol (8.8 kJ/mol) and the perpendicular one destabilized by 2.5 kcal/mol (10.5 kJ/mol). The classic explanations for this rotational barrier are steric repulsion between the ortho-hydrogen atoms (planar) and breaking of delocalization of pi density over both rings (perpendicular).

In QTAIM, the energy increase on decreasing the dihedral angle from 38° to 0° is a summation of several factors. Destabilizing factors are the increase in bond length between the connecting carbon atoms (because they have to accommodate the approaching hydrogen atoms) and transfer of electronic charge from carbon to hydrogen. Stabilizing factors are increased delocalization of pi-electrons from one ring to the other and (the one that tips the balance) is a hydrogen–hydrogen bond between the ortho hydrogens.

QTAIM has also been applied to study the electron topology of solvated post-translational modifications to proteins. For example, covalent–bond force constants in a set of lysine-arginine advanced glycation end-products were derived using electronic structure calculations, and then bond paths were used to illustrate differences in each of the applied computational chemistry functionals. Furthermore, QTAIM had been used to identify a bond-path network of hydrogen bonds between glucosepane and nearby water molecules.

The hydrogen-hydrogen bond is not without its critics. According to one, the relative stability of phenanthrene compared to its isomers can be adequately explained by comparing resonance stabilizations. Another critic argues that the stability of phenanthrene can be attributed to more effective pi-pi overlap in the central double bond; the existence of bond paths is not questioned but the stabilizing energy derived from them is.

== See also ==
- Quantum chemistry
