= Jeremy Hutson =

British theoretical chemist (born 1957)

Jeremy Mark Hutson FRS
- Born: 7 May 1957 (age 69); West Kirby, Cheshire, UK
- Education: Wadham College, Oxford (BA); Hertford College, Oxford (PhD)
- Awards: Thomson Prize (2016); Tilden Prize (2011); Humboldt Research Award (2010); Kolos Medal (2007); Corday-Morgan Prize (1991)
- Scientific career
- Fields: Physical chemistry
- Workplaces: Durham University
- Thesis: Anisotropic intermolecular forces in rare gas-hydrogen halide systems (1981)
- Doctoral advisor: Brian J. Howard
- Website: https://jmhutson.webspace.durham.ac.uk/

Jeremy Mark Hutson FRS (born 7 May 1957) is a British theoretical chemist noted for his research into the theory of ultracold molecules, as well as previous work on Van der Waals molecules and their spectroscopy.

== Education ==
Hutson graduated with first-class honours in Chemistry from Wadham College, Oxford in 1979. He earned his doctorate from Hertford College, Oxford two years later under the supervision of Brian J. Howard.

== Career and research ==
From 1981–1983, Hutson worked as a post-doctoral research fellow in the group of Robert J. LeRoy at the University of Waterloo. In 1983, Hutson became at independent research fellow at Pembroke College, Cambridge, before taking up a position as a Lecturer at Durham University in 1987. He was promoted to Reader in 1993 and Professor in 1996. Hutson was made a Fellow of the Royal Society in 2010. He served as head of the Durham University Department of Chemistry from 1998–2001.

Hutson was a member of the editorial board of the Journal of Chemical Physics from 1997–1999, and of Molecular Physics from 2000–2005.

== Awards and honours ==
- 1991: RSC Corday–Morgan Medal.
- 2007: Kołos Medal.
- 2010: Fellow of the Royal Society.
- 2011: RSC Tilden Prize
- 2016: Institute of Physics Joseph Thomson Medal and Prize.

== Personal life ==
Since 1998, Hutson has produced work on the history of Tudhoe and the wider County Durham area.
