= Philip Coppens (chemist) =

Dutch and American physical chemist (1930–2017)

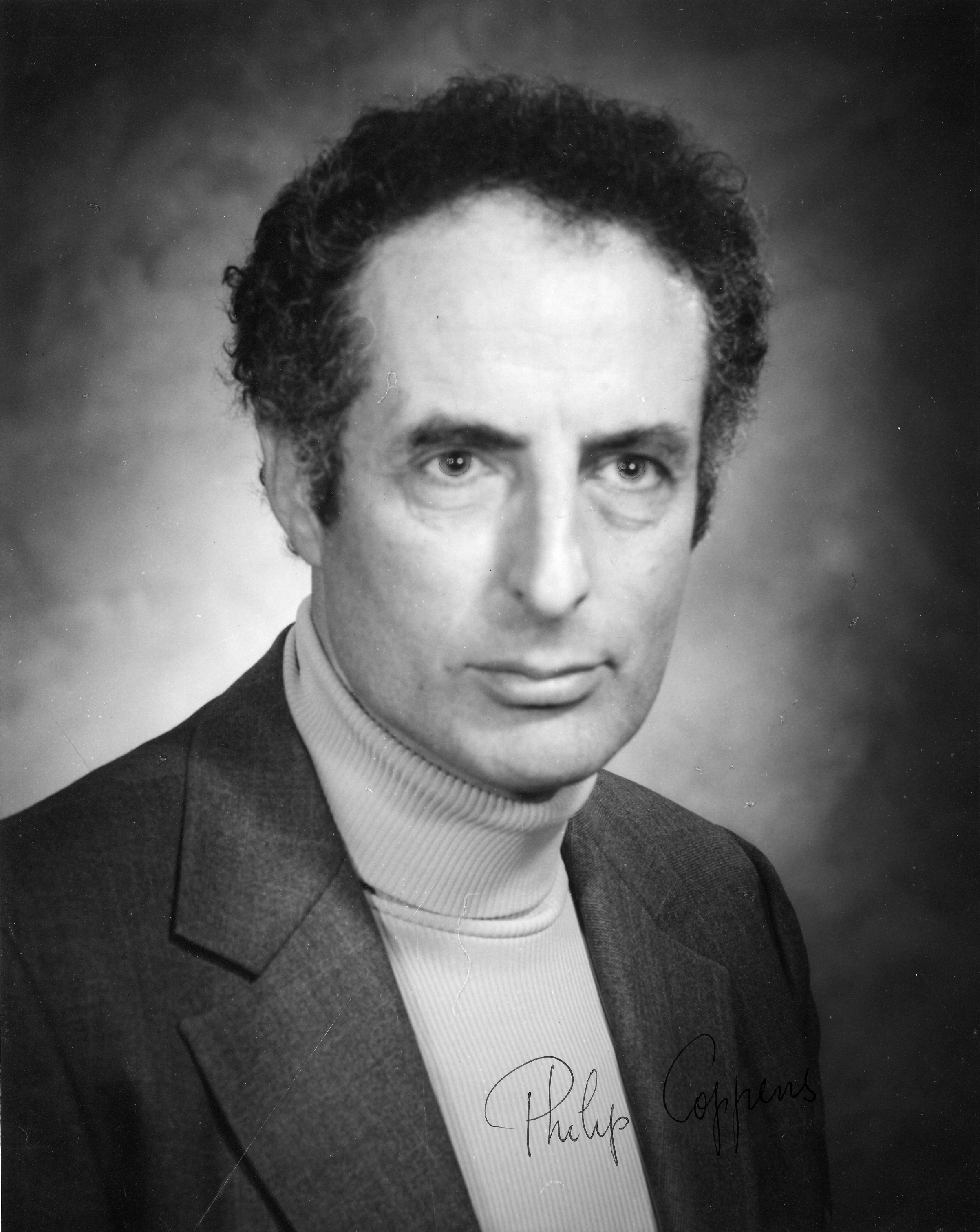
- Signed portrait, 1978
- Born: October 24, 1930; Amersfoort, the Netherlands
- Died: June 21, 2017 (aged 86); West Grove, Pennsylvania, USA
- Education: University of Amsterdam
- Known for: charge density analysis photocrystallography
- Scientific career
- Workplaces: Brookhaven National Laboratory; University at Buffalo
- Thesis: Structure and light-sensitivity of the crystals of some aromatic nitro compounds (1960)
- Doctoral advisor: Carolina MacGillavry
- Other academic advisors: Gerhard Schmidt

Philip Coppens (October 24, 1930 – June 21, 2017) was a Dutch-born American chemist and crystallographer known for his work on charge density analysis using X-rays crystallography and the pioneering work in the field of photocrystallography.

== Education and career ==
The Amersfoort-born Coppens received his B.S. and Ph.D. degrees from the University of Amsterdam in 1954 and 1960, where he was supervised by Carolina MacGillavry. In 1968, following appointments at the Weizmann Institute and Brookhaven National Laboratory, he was appointed in the chemistry department at the State University of New York at Buffalo. He was a SUNY Distinguished Professor and holder of the Henry M. Woodburn Chair of Chemistry. Among the many 3-dimensional structures Coppens characterized is the nitroprusside ion.

== Honours and awards ==
Coppens was a corresponding member of the Royal Netherlands Academy of Arts and Sciences since 1979 and a fellow of the American Association for the Advancement of Science from 1993. Additionally, he was awarded the Gregori Aminoff Prize of the Royal Swedish Academy of Sciences in 1996, the Ewald Prize of the International Union of Crystallography in 2005, and Kołos Medal in 2013.

== Bibliography ==
- Coppens, Philip, ed. (1972). Proceedings of the Symposium on "Experimental and Theoretical Studies of Electron Densities" at University of New Mexico, Albuquerque, New Mexico, April 4-5, 1972. Pittsburgh, Pa.: Polycrystal Book Service. OCLC 256278163.
- Coppens, Philip; Hall, Michael B, eds. (1982). Electron distributions and the chemical bond. New York: Plenum Press. ISBN 978-0-306-41000-0. OCLC 865271066.
- Coppens, Philip; Cox, David; Vlieg, Elias; Robinson, Ian K (1992). Synchrotron radiation crystallography. London; San Diego; New York: Academic Press. ISBN 978-0-12-188080-4. OCLC 468470415.
- Kao, Yi-Han; Kwok, Hoi-Sing; Coppens, Philip, eds. (1991). Superconductivity and its applications: Buffalo, NY 1990. New York: American Institute of physics. ISBN 978-0-88318-835-4. OCLC 468309233.
- Coppens, Philip (1997). X-ray charge densities and chemical bonding. Oxford: Oxford Univ. Press. ISBN 978-0-19-509823-5. OCLC 845312646.
