= Dihydrogen bond =

In chemistry, a dihydrogen bond is a kind of hydrogen bond, an interaction between a metal hydride bond and an OH or NH group or other proton donor. With a van der Waals radius of 1.2 Å, hydrogen atoms do not usually approach other hydrogen atoms closer than 2.4 Å. Close approaches near 1.8 Å, are, however, characteristic of dihydrogen bonding.

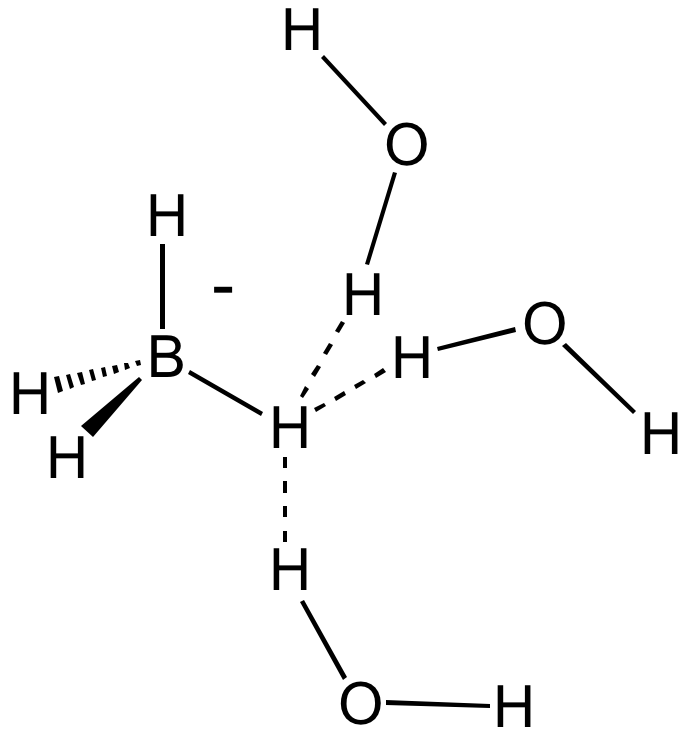
Dihydrogen bonding is evident in the close H---H contacts between water of crystallization and the borohydride anion in the salt NaBH_{4}(H_{2}O)_{2}.

== Boron hydrides ==
An early example of this phenomenon is credited to Brown and Heseltine. They observed intense absorptions in the IR bands at 3300 and 3210 cm^{−1} for a solution of (CH_{3})_{2}NHBH_{3}. The higher energy band is assigned to a normal N−H vibration whereas the lower energy band is assigned to the same bond, which is interacting with the B−H. Upon dilution of the solution, the 3300 cm^{−1} band increased in intensity and the 3210 cm^{−1} band decreased, indicative of intermolecular association.

Interest in dihydrogen bonding was reignited upon the crystallographic characterization of the molecule H_{3}NBH_{3}. In this molecule, like the one studied by Brown and Hazeltine, the hydrogen atoms on nitrogen have a partial positive charge, denoted H^{δ+}, and the hydrogen atoms on boron have a partial negative charge, often denoted H^{δ−}. In other words, the amine is a protic acid and the borane end is hydridic. The resulting B−H^{...}H−N attractions stabilize the molecule as a solid. In contrast, the related substance ethane, H_{3}CCH_{3}, is a gas with a boiling point 285 °C lower. Because two hydrogen centers are involved, the interaction is termed a dihydrogen bond. Formation of a dihydrogen bond is assumed to precede formation of H_{2} from the reaction of a hydride and a protic acid. A very short dihydrogen bond is observed in NaBH_{4}·2H_{2}O with H−H contacts of 1.79, 1.86, and 1.94 Å.

== Coordination chemistry ==
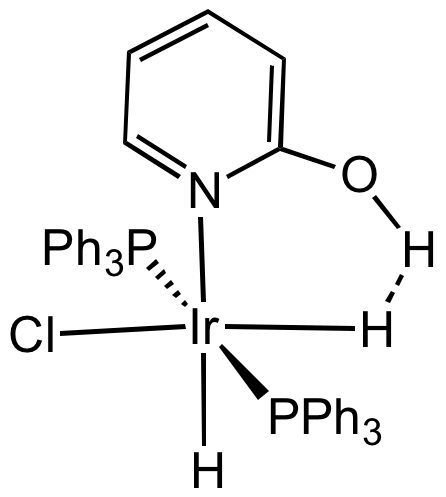
Dihydrogen bonding exists between the hydroxypyridine and a hydride ligand in this iridium complex.

Protonation of transition metal hydride complexes is generally thought to occur via dihydrogen bonding. This kind of H−H interaction is distinct from the H−H bonding interaction in dihydrogen complexes, which have a dihydrogen molecule bound to a metal.

== In neutral compounds ==
So-called hydrogen–hydrogen bond interactions have been proposed to occur between two neutral non-bonding hydrogen atoms from atoms in molecules theory, while similar interactions have been shown to exist experimentally. Many of these types of dihydrogen bonds have been identified in molecular aggregates.
