= Śniadecki =

Śniadecki is a surname. Notable people with the surname include:

- Jan Śniadecki (1756–1830), Polish mathematician, philosopher, and astronomer
- Jędrzej Śniadecki (1768–1838), Polish writer, physician, chemist, and biologist, brother of Jan
