= Institute of Physics Joseph Thomson Medal and Prize =

Awarded for atomic or molecular physics

Joseph Thomson Medal and Prize
- Awarded for: Atomic physics
- Sponsored by: Institute of Physics
- Presented by: Institute of Physics
- Rewards: Silver medal, £1000
- First award: 2008
- Website: http://www.iop.org/about/awards/

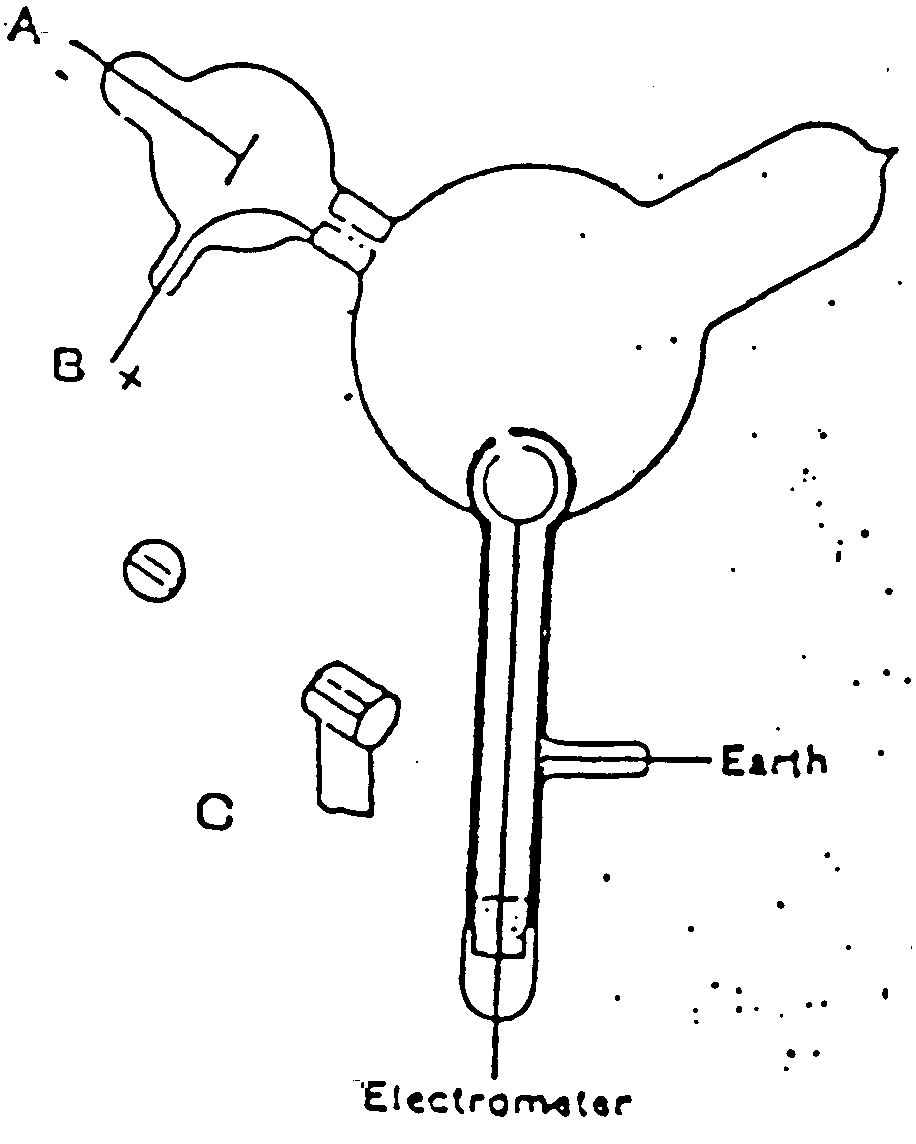
The cathode ray tube by which J. J. Thomson demonstrated that cathode rays could be deflected by a magnetic field.

The Thomson Medal and Prize is an award which has been made, originally only biennially in even-numbered years, since 2008 by the British Institute of Physics for "distinguished research in atomic (including quantum optics) or molecular physics". It is named after Nobel prizewinner Sir J. J. Thomson, the British physicist who demonstrated the existence of electrons, and comprises a silver medal and a prize of £1000.

Not to be confused with the J. J. Thomson IET Achievement Medal for electronics.

== Medallists ==
The following have received a medal:

- 2026: Myungshik Kim, for foundational advances that redefined nonclassicality as a physical resource and extended quantum optics from photonic systems to mechanical, plasmonic and gravitational regimes, shaping modern quantum technologies.
- 2024: Janne Ruostekoski, for outstanding contributions to the fundamental understanding of cooperative interactions between light and atomic ensembles, as well as for pioneering efforts in harnessing these interactions for applications.
- 2023: Ulrich Schneider, for groundbreaking experiments on the collective dynamics of quantum gases in optical lattices, including fundamental studies of localization effects in both disordered and quasicrystalline systems.
- 2022: Michael Tarbutt, for pioneering experimental and theoretical work on the production of ultracold molecules by laser cooling, and the applications of those molecules to quantum science and tests of fundamental physics.
- 2021: Carla Faria, for distinguished contributions to the theory of strong-field laser-matter interactions.
- 2020: Michael Charlton, for scientific leadership in antimatter science.
- 2019: Simon L. Cornish, for outstanding contributions to experiments on ultra-cold atoms and molecules
- 2016: Jeremy M. Hutson, for his pioneering work on the theory of ultracold molecules
- 2014: Charles S Adams, for his imaginative experiments which have pioneered the field of Rydberg quantum optics
- 2012: Michael Köhl, for his pioneering experimental work in Bose-Einstein condensates and cold Fermi gases
- 2010: Gaetana Laricchia, for her contributions to the development of the world's only positronium beam
- 2008: Edward Hinds, for his important and elegant experimental investigations in the fields of atomic physics and quantum optics

== See also ==
- Institute of Physics Awards
- List of physics awards
- List of awards named after people
