= Charlotte Haldane =

British writer (1894–1969)

- Born: Charlotte Franken; April 27, 1894; Sydenham, London
- Died: March 16, 1969 (aged 74)
- Education: South Hampstead High School
- Occupations: Journalist, writer, biographer
- Political party: Communist Party of Great Britain
- Movement: Feminism
- Spouse(s): John McLeod Burghes; J. B. S. Haldane
- Children: Ronald John McLeod Burghes
- Parent(s): Joseph Franken; Mathilde Saarbach

Charlotte Haldane (née Franken; 27 April 1894 – 16 March 1969) was a British feminist writer. Her second husband was the biologist J.B.S. Haldane.

== Biography ==
Charlotte Franken was born in Sydenham, London. Her parents were Jewish immigrants, her father, Joseph, a German fur trader. In 1906 the family moved to Antwerp. She enrolled on a typing course in London. Charlotte later described herself as a "feminist and suffragette" from the age of sixteen. During the First World War her parents were interned but emigrated in 1915 to the United States.

She married Jack Burghes in 1918 and they had a son, Ronnie. Charlotte joined the Daily Express as a journalist in 1920; she also became an advocate of divorce reform, married women's employment, and easier access to contraception. In 1924 she interviewed the biologist J.B.S. Haldane for the Daily Express, and they soon became friends. She then had a scandalous divorce from her husband, and married Haldane in 1926. In the same year, she wrote a dystopian novel, Man's World, set in a society ruled by a male scientific elite who restrict the number of women born. From adolescence women in this world are either made into "vocational mothers" or, if they have no interest in motherhood, they are sterilized by the government and become "neuters". Man's World is sometimes compared to other dystopian novels of the interwar period, including Aldous Huxley's Brave New World and Katharine Burdekin's Swastika Night.

Her 1927 book Motherhood and Its Enemies drew some criticism for its attacks on spinsters and suffragettes for "devaluing motherhood" and causing male-female "sex antagonism." Despite Charlotte Haldane's feminism, Sheila Jeffreys has called Motherhood and its Enemies "an antifeminist classic".

In 1937 Charlotte joined the Communist Party of Great Britain. During this time she also worked as editor of the anti-fascist magazine Woman Today. During the Spanish Civil War she took part in fund-raising activities on behalf of the International Brigades, becoming honorary secretary of the Dependents Aid Committee and serving as receptionist of recruits in Paris. Later she acted as a guide and interpreter to Paul Robeson when he toured the country during the war. Her son, Ronny, also joined the International Brigades and was wounded in the arm, returning to Britain in the autumn of 1937.

Charlotte Haldane was sent to the Moscow by the Daily Sketch to report on the Soviets' progress in defending themselves against the German invasion of 1941 (called Operation Barbarossa). She witnessed peasant protests against collectivisation and became disillusioned with the monolithic defence of Soviet communism, which J.B.S. still believed in, writing about it in Russian Newsreel. The Haldanes separated in 1942 and divorced in 1945. J.B.S. later married Helen Spurway.

She spent her last years writing biographies of several historical figures. She died in 1969 from pneumonia.

== Bibliography ==
- Man's World (1926)
- Motherhood and Its Enemies (1927)
- Brother to Bert (1930)
- I Bring Not Peace (1932)
- Youth Is A Crime (1934)
- Melusine (1936)
- Russian Newsreel (1941)
- Crooked Sapling (stage play, 1944)
- Truth Will Out (autobiography, 1949)
- Justice is Deaf (radio play, 1950)
- Marcel Proust (1951)
- The Shadow of a Dream (1953)
- Age of Consent (stage play, 1953)
- The Gallyslaves of Love (1957)
- Mozart (1960)
- Daughter of Paris (1961)
- Tempest over Tahiti (1963)
- The Last Great Empress of China (1965)
- Queen of Hearts: Marguerite of Valois (1968)
- Madame de Maintenon; uncrowned Queen of France (1970)
