= The Homestead, Spondon =

The Homestead
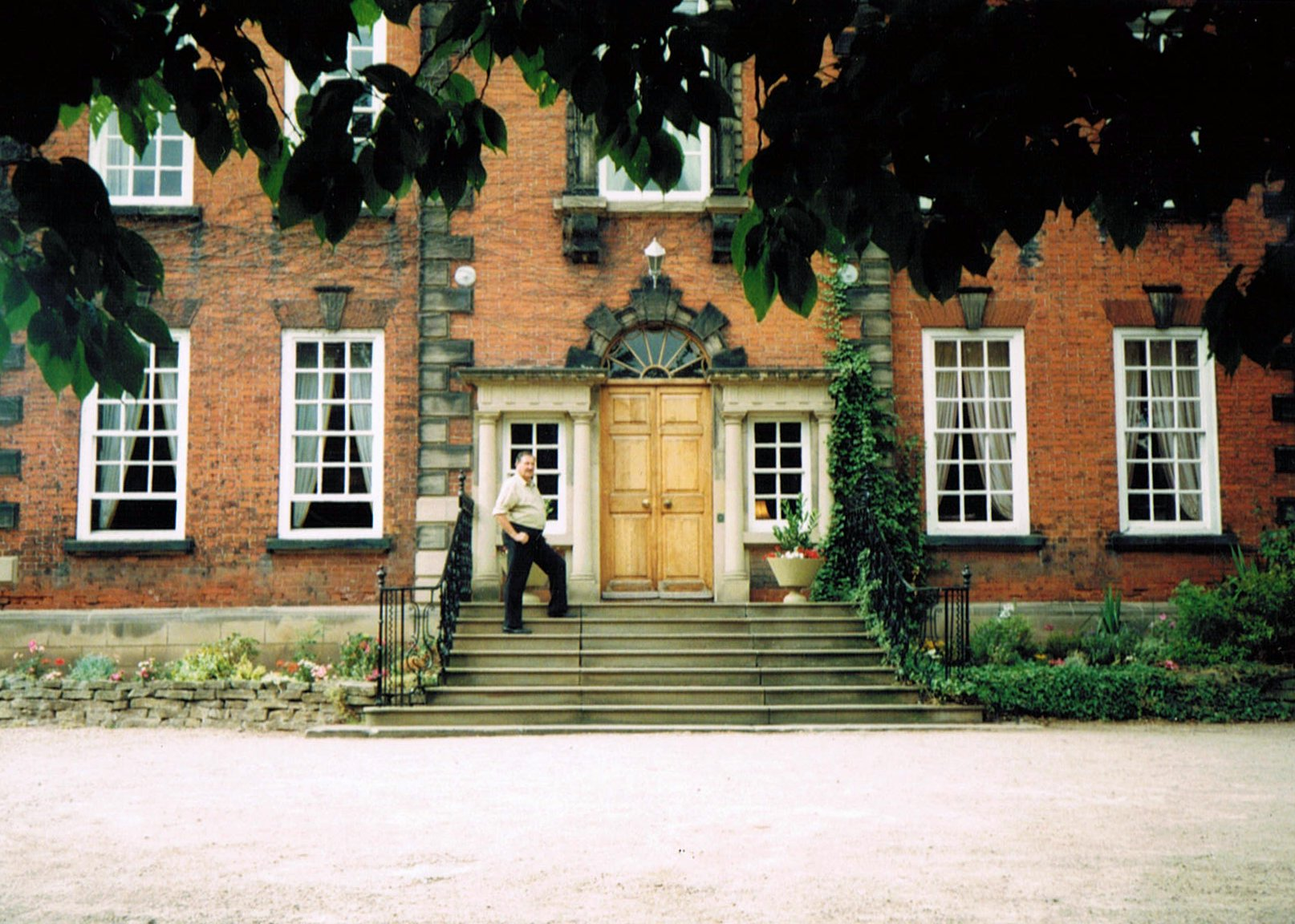

- Location in Derbyshire
- 52.9192°N 1.4059°W
- Location: 36 Sitwell St, Spondon, Derby, UK
- OS grid reference: SK40034 35920

History
- Built: c. 1710-1736
- Built for: John Anthill

Site notes
- Elevation: 76 m (249 ft)
- Architect: In the style of Francis Smith of Warwick
- Architectural styles: Georgian, British Queen Anne

Listed Building – Grade I
- Designated: 10 November 1967
- Reference no.: 1229478

The Homestead is a nine-bedroom Georgian house in the conservation area of Spondon, Derby, England. It is Grade I listed.

== History ==
The Homestead was originally known as Homeside, and was built for local tanner John Anthill between 1710 and 1736, although the only certain date is a rainwater head marked 1740. It is similar in style to contemporary houses in the area designed by Francis Smith of Warwick, but because of peculiar proportioning, it is thought that it is actually a copy by a more local builder.

The house was briefly used as a school by Rev John Cade, whose first wife, Mary, inherited the house from William Anthill in 1788. The house was continuously owned by the Cade family until 1911, when Charles James Cade chose to sell. The house was used from 1917 as the residence of the managing director of the local chemical plant, known as the British Cellulose and Chemical Manufacturing Co or later British Celanese. At the beginning of that period, the interior oak panelling was stripped of its paint by Elizabeth, wife of Garnet Hughes, and the original large fireplace in the drawing room was uncovered. The Homestead was officially purchased by the company in 1920, when the managing director W.A.M. Soller was installed. In 1954, the house became a corporate guest facility for the plant. Courtaulds, the successor to British Celanese and who maintained the house in exemplary fashion, sold The Homestead in 1996 for £250000.

It was listed in 1967 on the Register of Buildings of Special Architectural or Historic Interest, and is currently Grade I, meaning it is of exceptional interest. In the corner of the grounds there is a mostly Edwardian coach house and stable block with a cupola and weather vane atop; it is Grade II listed.

In 2011, it was unsuccessfully put up for sale with a guide price of £1.2m. and it is currently being marketed again at an asking price of £640,000.

An ancient watercourse runs along Hall Dyke and through the grounds.

== Architecture ==
The Georgian-period house in the Queen Anne style is situated on the brow of a hill rising from the Derwent valley, and is constructed out of red brick and dressed with stone, and uses rusticated stone quoining of millstone grit. It is 2½ storeys, and composed of five bays with sash windows, with the central bay projecting. The entrance is said to employ Venetian styling because it is in three parts, with the central doors being flanked by two rectangular sidelights with doric entablatures supported by doric half columns, and above the door is a segmentally headed fanlight. Surmounting this are two further round-headed windows with the top one projecting into the open pediment; the first story window has a large corbelled stone sill, and is framed by ionic pilasters. The house is coped with stone on top of a brick parapet, and the roof is mainly of clay tile. The balustrades up the main flight of stone steps are in the style of Robert Bakewell, or by Robert Bakewell, himself. The rusticated stone gate piers with acorn finials are specifically mentioned in its entry on the English Heritage register.

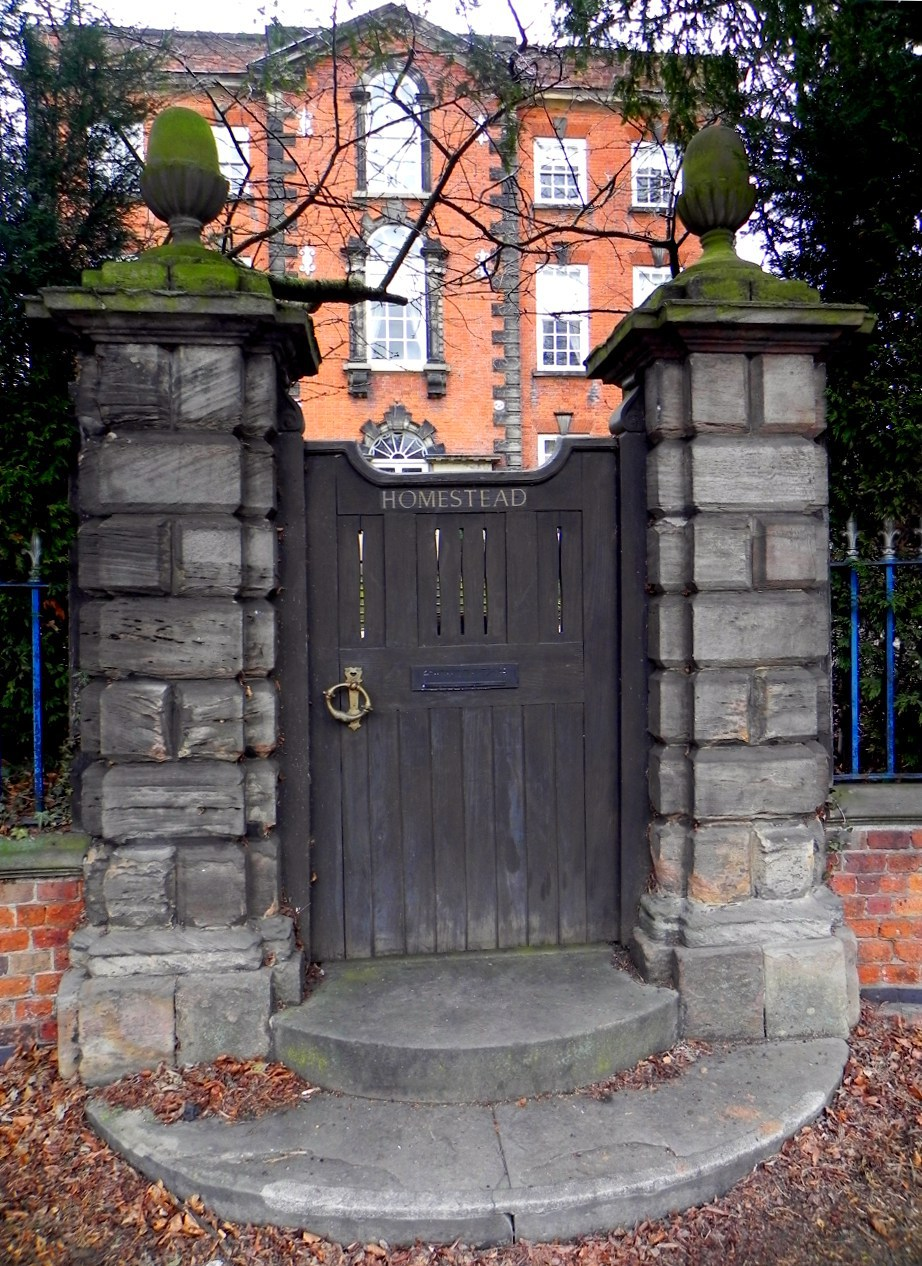
Stone gate piers with acorn finials

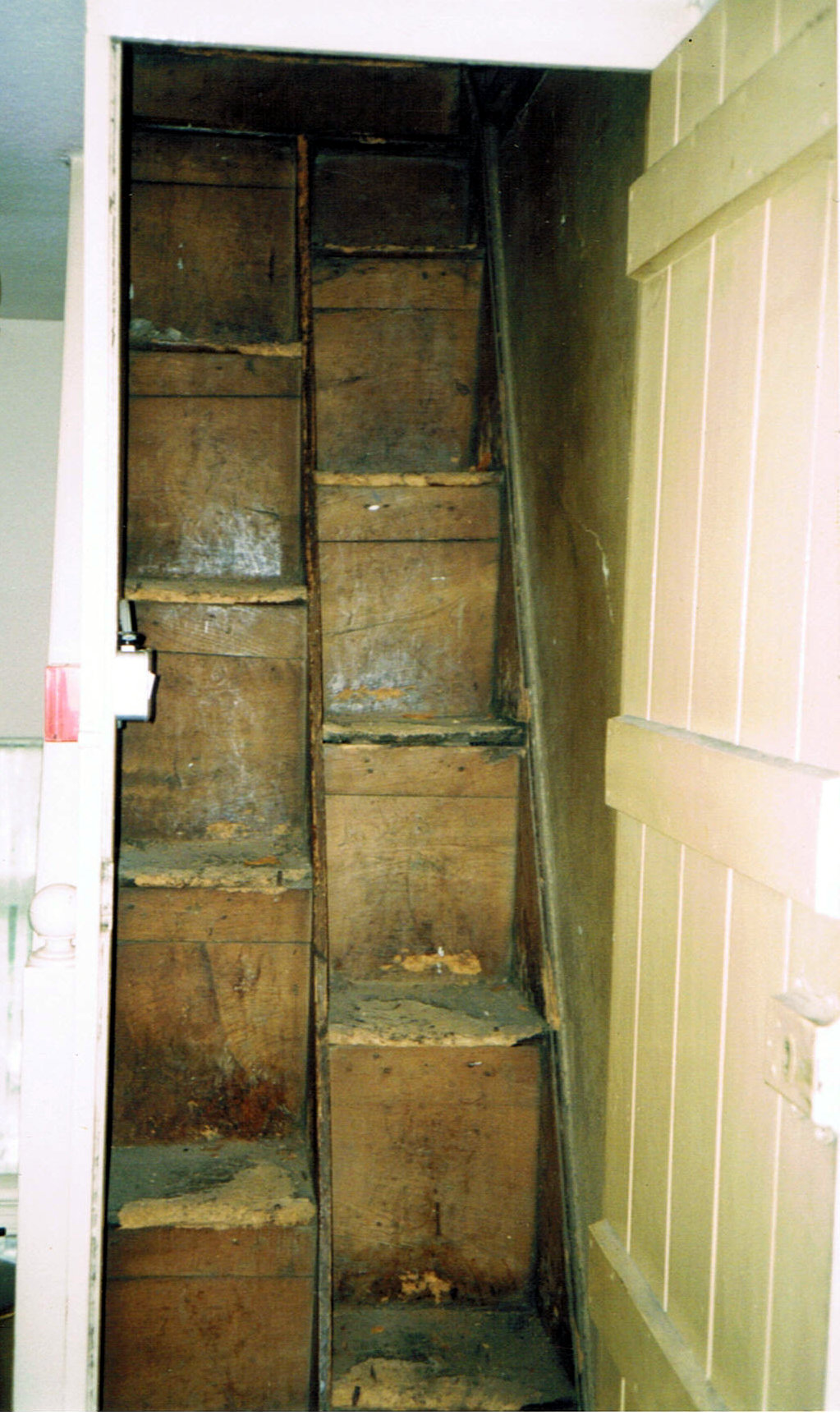
Split wooden staircase leading to roof

Internal features include a three-flight oak staircase with carved tread ends, a fully panelled dining room, a secret passage to the cellar, and an unusual split staircase leading to the roof. The plasterwork inside is impressive, and similar to other work in Derby by Abraham Denstone the elder. The house also retains much of its original furniture.

== Notable occupants ==
- Rev John Cade
- Dr James Cade
- Anna Romana Wright, daughter of Joseph Wright of Derby
- Katharine Burdekin (born Cade), feminist author whose works include Swastika Night
- Rowena Cade, founder of the Minack Theatre
- Sir Henry Fowler, Chief Mechanical Engineer for the London, Midland and Scottish Railway
- Major General Garnet Burk Hughes, Managing Director of the British Cellulose Company
- Drs Camille Dreyfus and Henri Dreyfus, Swiss industrialists lured to Spondon by the War Office to produce cellulose acetate for aircraft skins

== See also ==
- Grade I listed buildings in Derbyshire
- Listed buildings in Spondon
