= Koertge =

Koertge is a surname. Notable people with the surname include:

- Noretta Koertge (fl. 1981), American philosopher of science
- Ron Koertge (born 1940), American poet and author
