= Spondon =

Village and area of Derby, Derbyshire, England

Coordinates: 52.92°N 1.401°W

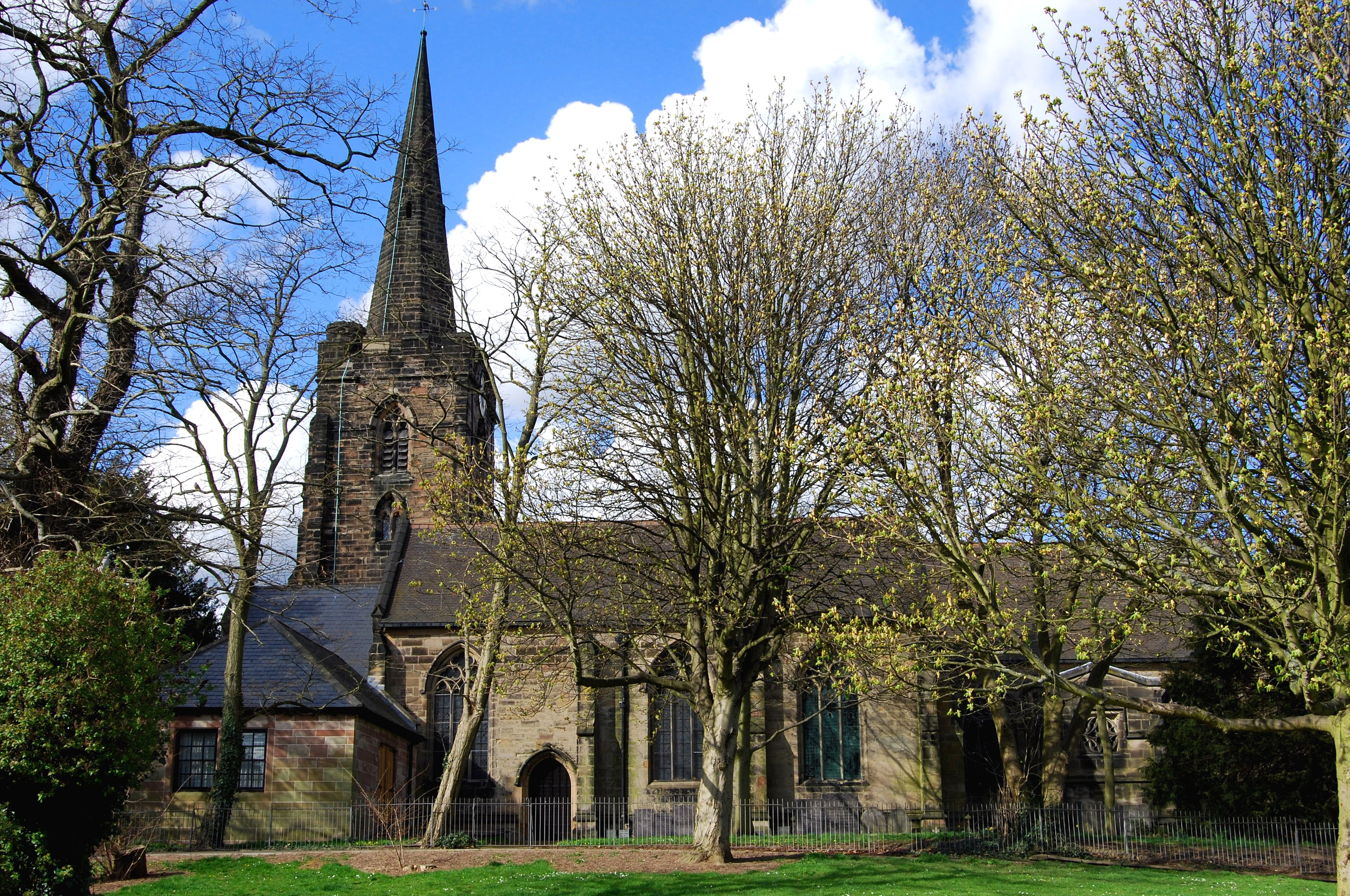
- St Werburgh's Church

- Location within Derbyshire
- Area: 7.97 km^{2} (3.08 sq mi)
- Population: 12,377 (2011)
  - Density: 1,553/km^{2} (4,020/sq mi)
- OS grid reference: SK403360
- Unitary authority: Derby
- Ceremonial county: Derbyshire
- Region: East Midlands
- Country: England
- Sovereign state: United Kingdom
- Post town: DERBY
- Postcode district: DE21
- Dialling code: 01332
- Police: Derbyshire
- Fire: Derbyshire
- Ambulance: East Midlands
- UK Parliament: Mid Derbyshire

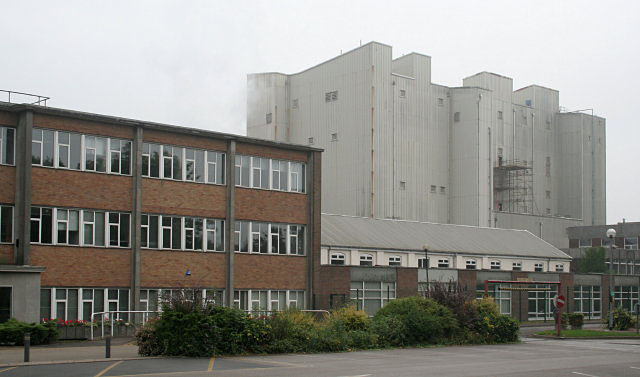
British Celanese Factory

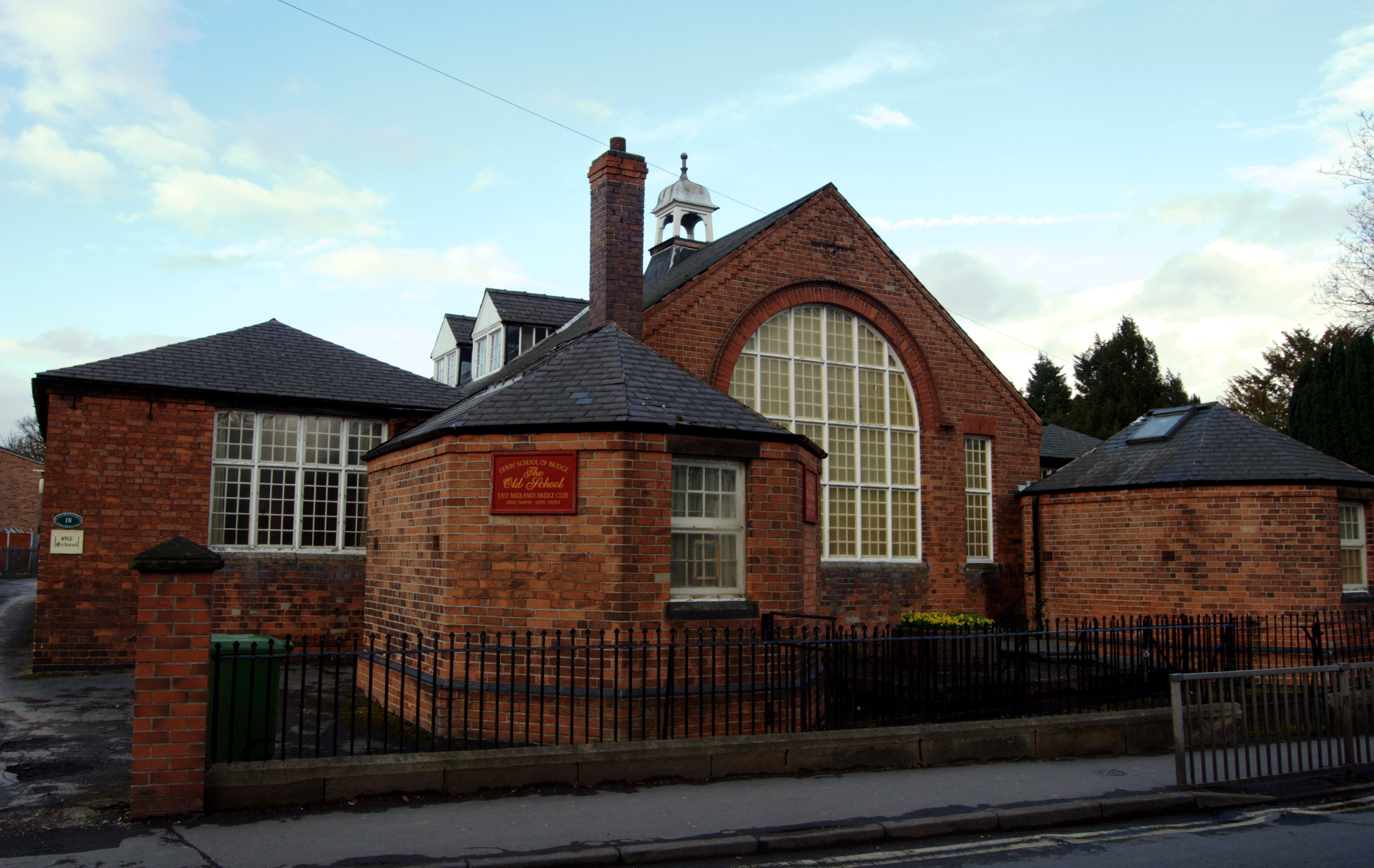
Old School, Chapel Street

Spondon Village Hall

Spondon Library

Spondon is a large village and area of the city of Derby, in the ceremonial county of Derbyshire, England. Originally a small village, Spondon dates back to the Domesday Book of 1086, and it became heavily industrialised in the 19th and early 20th centuries, with companies such as British Celanese.

== History ==
The name Spondon is Anglo-Saxon and describes a gravelly hill. The village is mentioned in the Domesday Book of 1086. In about 1333, a great fire, starting at The Malt Shovel, a local pub, and aided by an easterly wind, swept through the village destroying the church and all but a few houses, with just one casualty, the mayor. The damage was so great that a judge, Roger de Bankwell, was sent to hear pleas for relief from taxes. The Great Fire of Spondon is still commemorated and taught as part of the curriculum in local schools. A village fair was held on its 650th anniversary (circa.1990).

Spondon became heavily industrialised in the 19th and the early 20th centuries, with companies such as British Celanese (now Celanese Corporation). The large site is now closed, but it made initially cellulose acetate during World War I and later other artificial fibres.

== Government ==
Spondon is part of the City of Derby and sits in the Mid Derbyshire constituency for Westminster elections.

In 1961 the civil parish had a population of 11,541. On 1 April 1968 the parish was abolished and merged with Derby, Dale Abbey and Ockbrook. It is now in the unparished area of Derby, in the Derby district.

== Geography ==
The community lies on the north slope of the valley of the River Derwent east of Derby and is divided by the A52, which separates the residential Spondon village area at the top of the hill from the heavily industrialised area at the bottom.

== Demography ==
At the census in 2011 Spondon had a population of 12,377 of which 94.6% were White British, compared to 75.3% for Derby as a whole.

== Economy ==
The industrial belt lies to the south of Nottingham Road/Derby Road (an old Roman road) as does the disused canal and the railway. These barriers separate the residential three-quarters of the village from its industrial quarter. The various industries have included a dye works, electricity generating station, two scrapyards, sewage works, British Celanese synthetic fibres works and a tannery.

Spondon holds a small number of chain shops but continues to support the business of many independent tradespeople too, including a men's barbers, a gift shop and a bakery. Chapel Street and Sitwell Street (in the centre) are the main areas of this retail activity. Dale Road (north-east) and Nottingham Road/Derby Road (south) also have a row of shops. Superstores are also in Spondon.

== Culture and community ==
There are many clubs, groups and societies serving Spondon. The Spondon Village Festival (Carnival) was first held in 2010 and it was hoped that it would become an annual event combining carnival and fair, but this has fallen through. Spondon won the Urban Community award from Britain in Bloom in 2005.

Facilities include one library, two social clubs, six public houses (the names and numbers have not changed since 1961). The parks are Brunswood (playground and playing field), Dale Road (field and landscaping), South Avenue Rec (playground and field), Gravel Pit Lane (playing field), Locko Park (country park), Spondon Woods (woods and scrub), Stoney Cross (woods and scrub) and Willowcroft (playing field).

The Asterdale Club (formerly the Celanese Workers' Club) is closed, but the grounds house two football teams and an archery club, club grounds, village parks, the village hall and the old school hall.

== Landmarks ==
The historic centre of the village is designated as a conservation area. Locko Park is a Grade II*-listed mansion dating from 1669. The Homestead is a large detached Georgian mansion on Sitwell Street. The Stone Archways in Park Road mark the entrance to the now demolished Spondon House. The Enoch Stone Memorial marks the spot on Derby Road where a notorious murder took place in 1856 although this is in neighbouring Chaddesden.

== Transport ==
Derby Canal (Derby – Sandiacre) opened in 1795, and enabled other industries. The canal closed in 1964. The Derby & Sandiacre Canal Trust continue in their efforts to reinstate the canal. Borrowash Bottom Lock was repaired in 2018 and Sandiacre Lock has been dug out (Feb 2019). Other sections have been handed over to the Trust and are being cleared of vegetation.(2019)

The Midland Counties Railway opened a line from Derby to Nottingham in 1839. This line became part of the Midland Main Line to London St Pancras railway station. Spondon railway station has a rather limited service towards both Derby and Nottingham.

The A52, 'Borrowash by-pass' recently named Brian Clough Way, cuts through the village and provides express road (dual-carriageway) links to the west (Derby) and the east (M1 and Nottingham). Regional Cycle Route 66 links Spondon to Chaddesden and Alvaston.

The Spondon Flyer service provided a non-stop bus link to Derby city centre until its withdrawal in November 2021.

== Education ==
There are five state schools located in the village. Primary Schools – Asterdale (south-east), Borrow Wood (north-east), St. Werburgh's C of E and Springfield.

Secondary Schools – West Park School.

In 1989 secondary education changes saw Spondon School (formerly Spondon House) merge and the name changed to West Park School. The school was located on two adjoining sites. These sites being the 'upper school' (1960s, grey brick, concrete and glass) at the top of the hillside, the current site, and the 'lower school' (1970s, grey brick, brown tile, timber and glass) at the foot of the hillside. It was the names of the roads leading to the upper and lower schools that formed the new name. An expansion on the West Road (upper school) site led to the closure of the Park Road (lower school site). The lower school burned down.

== Religious sites ==
St Werburgh's Church dates from around 1390, replacing an earlier church destroyed by fire in 1340. In the churchyard is an Anglo-Saxon cross dating from c.870.

As well as St Werburgh's, there is the Spondon Methodist Church built in 1934 before the existence of the A52.

== Sport ==
- Spondon Cricket Club
- Spondon Dynamos Football Club
- Spondon Bowls Club
- Anchor Bowmen Archery Club
- Spondon Snooker & Pool Club

== Notable people ==
Born in Spondon –

- Anthony Borrington, cricketer.
- Katharine Burdekin (born Cade), feminist author was born here.
- Rowena Cade, founder Minack Theatre
- Donna Kellogg, Badminton Player.
- Michael Knowles, actor.
- James Herbert Matthews, member of Canadian parliament.
- Robert Priseman, artist.
- William Thompson, cricketer.

Links to Spondon –

- Ray Colledge, mountaineer who made the third British ascent of the North Face of the Eiger in 1969.
- Graham Coxon, guitarist with Blur.
- Drury Curzon Drury-Lowe, lieutenant-general and knight of the realm.
- Henry Evans, cricketer.
- Sir Henry Fowler, Chief Engineer for the London Midland and Scottish Railway.
- Paul R. Gregory, artist.
- Richard William Hunt, Keeper of the Western Manuscripts, Bodleian Library.
- George Porter, cricketer.
- Ben Osborn - footballer for Sheffield United, attended West Park School in Spondon.

== See also ==
- Listed buildings in Spondon
