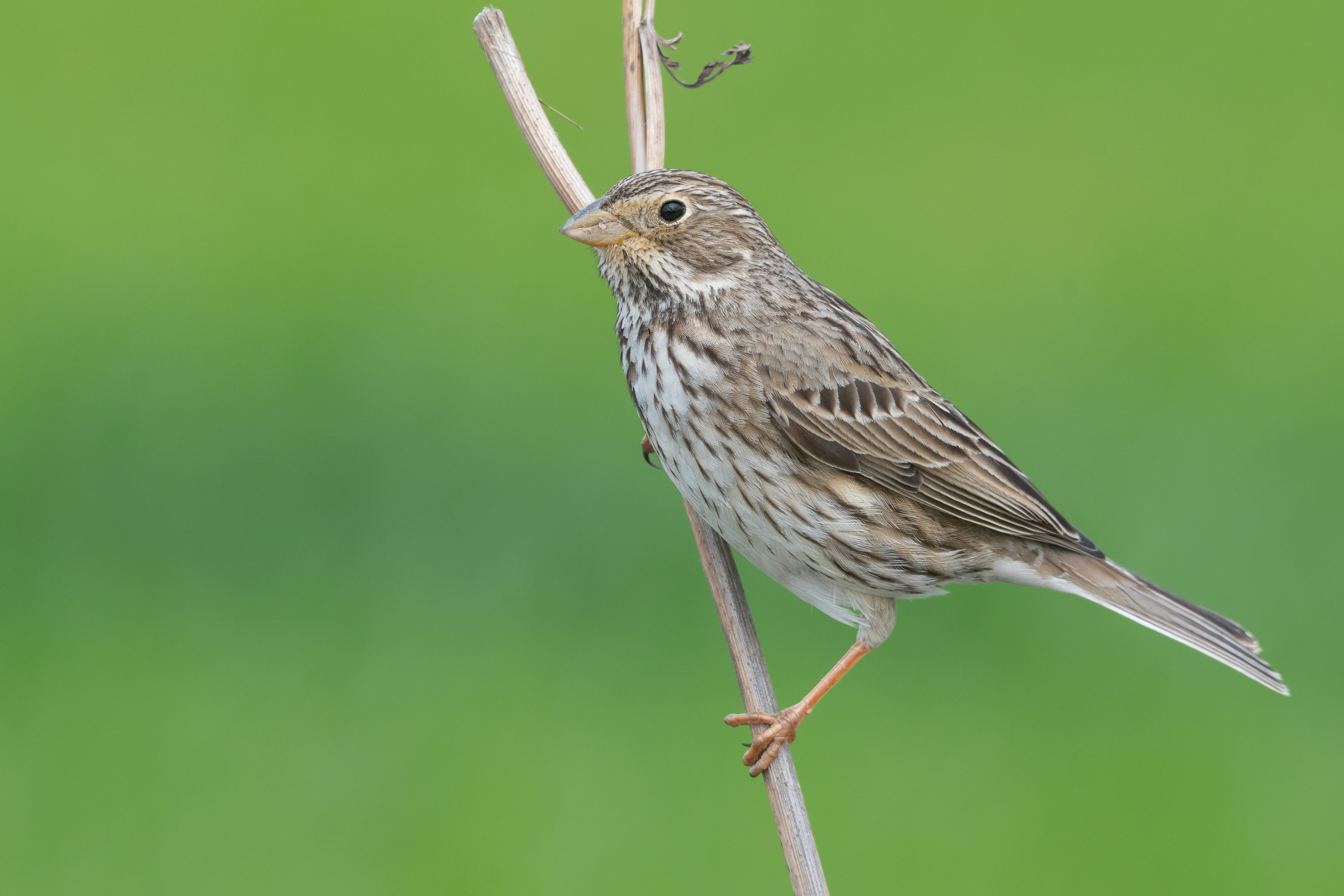
- In Tunisia, Ichkeul National Park
- Male singing in Dorset, England. Recorded by Lawrence Shove.

Conservation status
- Least Concern (IUCN 3.1)

Scientific classification
- Kingdom: Animalia
- Phylum: Chordata
- Class: Aves
- Order: Passeriformes
- Family: Emberizidae
- Genus: Emberiza
- Species: E. calandra

Binomial name
- Emberiza calandra Linnaeus, 1758
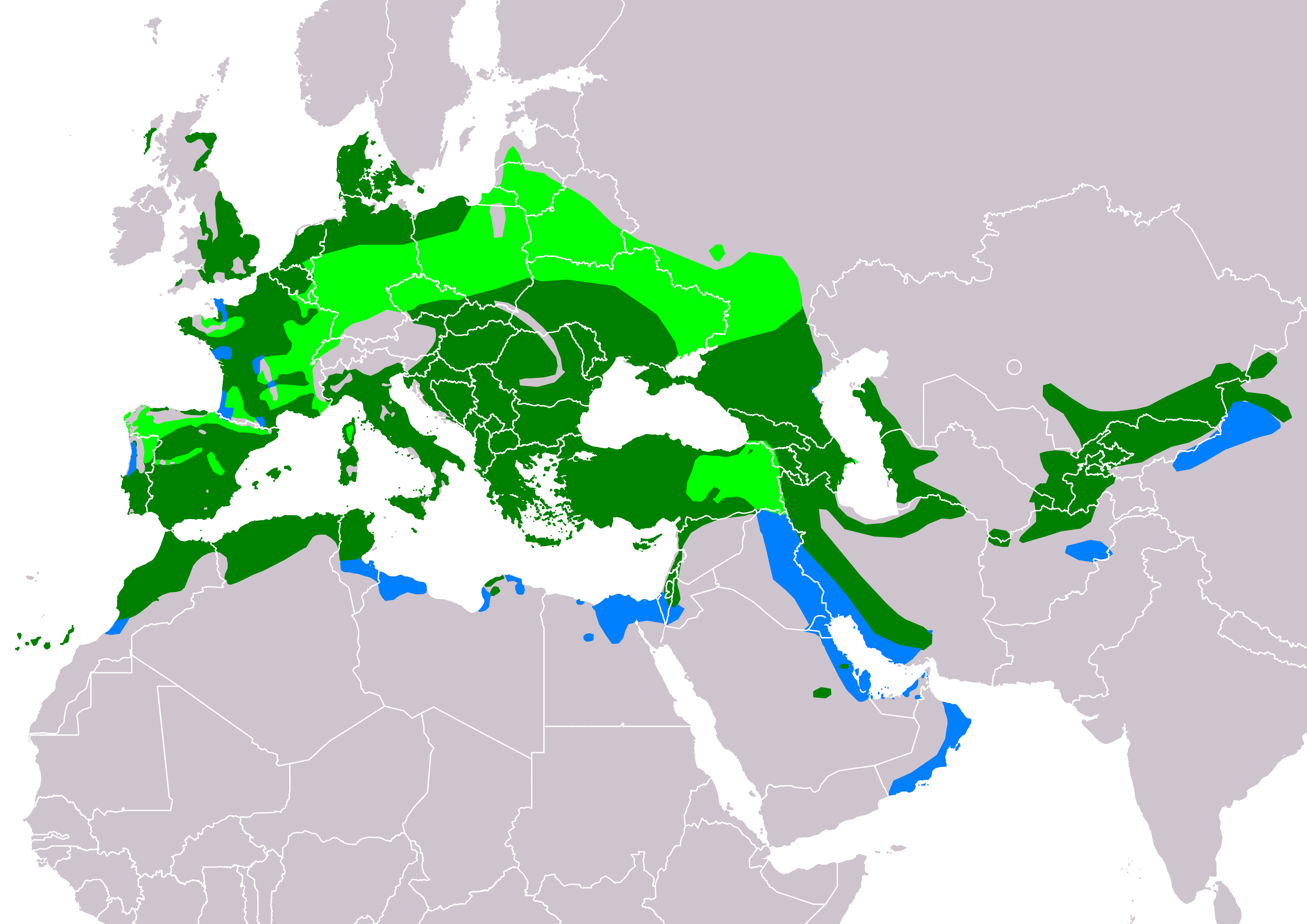
- Range of E. calandra Breeding Resident Non-breeding

Synonyms
- Emberiza miliaria Linnaeus, 1766; Miliaria calandra (Linnaeus, 1758); Miliaria europaea Swainson, 1837; Miliaria minor (Radde, 1884); Crithagra miliaria (Linnaeus, 1766)

= Corn bunting =

Species of bird

The corn bunting (Emberiza calandra) is a passerine bird in the bunting family Emberizidae, a group now separated by most modern authors from the finches, Fringillidae. This is a large bunting with heavily streaked buff-brown plumage. The sexes are similar but the male is slightly larger than the female. Its range extends from Western Europe and North Africa across to northwestern China.

== Taxonomy ==
The corn bunting was formally described by the Swedish naturalist Carl Linnaeus in 1758 in the tenth edition of his Systema Naturae and retains its original binomial name of Emberiza calandra. The type locality is Sweden. The genus name Emberiza is from Old German Embritz, a bunting. The specific calandra is from Ancient Greek kalandros, the calandra lark. The corn bunting has sometimes been placed in its own monotypic genus Miliaria.

Two subspecies are recognised:

- E. c. calandra Linnaeus, 1758 – northwest Africa, Canary Islands and Europe to Turkey, the Caucasus and north Iran
- E. c. buturlini Johansen, HE, 1907 – Middle East to northwest China

== Description ==
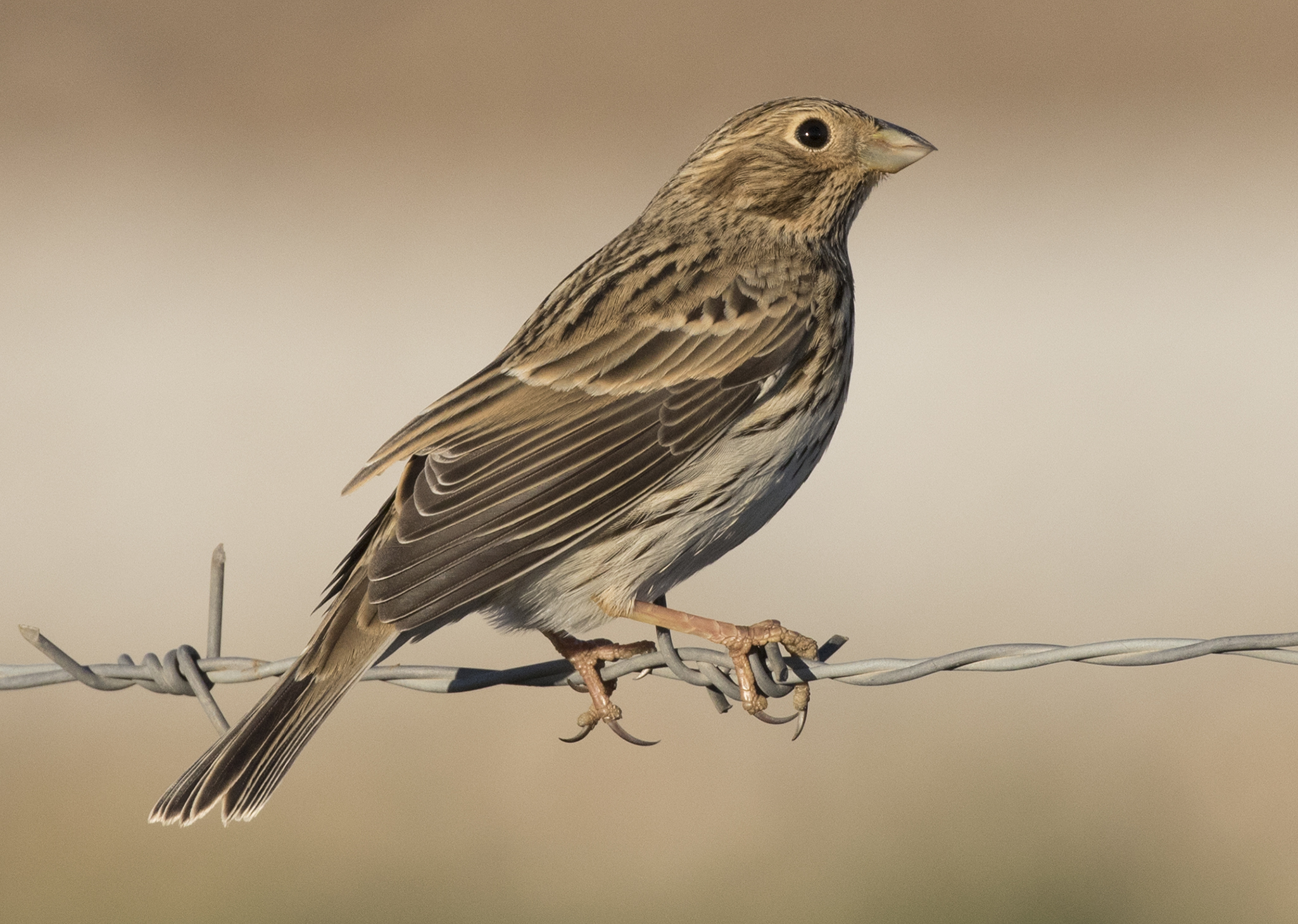
In Turkey

This is an unusual bunting because the plumages of the sexes are similar in appearance, though the male is approximately 20% larger than the female. This large bulky bunting is 16–19 cm long, with a conspicuously dark eye and yellowish mandibles. Males lack any showy colours, especially on the head, which is otherwise typical of genus Emberiza. Both sexes look something like larks, being streaked grey-brown above with whitish underparts. The underparts are streaked over the flanks and breast, and the streaking forms gorget around the throat. The lesser wing coverts are distinctively dark and white-tipped. The tail is plain brown.

The song of the male is a repetitive metallic sound, usually likened to jangling keys, which is given from a low bush, fence post or telephone wires.

== Distribution and habitat ==
It breeds across southern and central Europe, north Africa and Asia across to Kazakhstan. It is mainly resident, but some birds from colder regions of central Europe and Asia migrate southwards in winter.

The corn bunting is a bird of open country with trees, such as farmland and weedy wasteland. It has declined greatly in north-west Europe due to intensive agricultural practices depriving it of its food supply of weed seeds and insects, the latter especially vital when feeding the young. UK conservation status is red. It has recently become extinct in Wales and Ireland, where it was previously common.

== Behaviour and ecology ==
=== Food and feeding ===
Its natural food consists mainly of seeds but also includes insects such as crickets, especially when feeding young.

=== Breeding ===
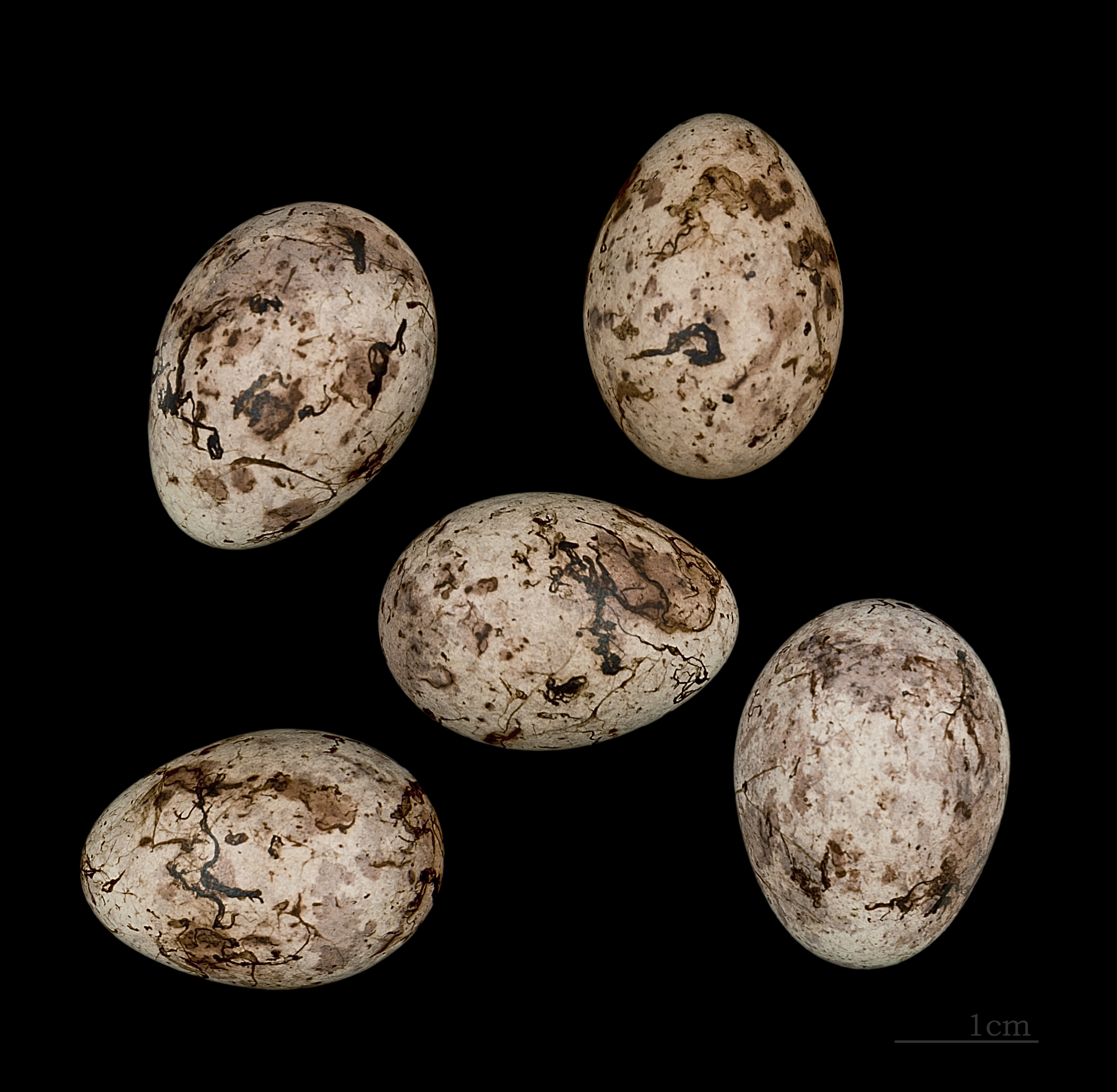
Eggs

Males defend territories in the breeding season and can be polygynous, with up to three females per breeding male. The population sex ratio is generally 1:1, which means some males remain unmated during a season. Males play only a small role in parental care; they are not involved in nest building or incubation, and only feed the chicks when they are over half grown.

The nest is made of grass, lined with hair or fine grass, and is usually built on the ground. Average clutch size is four, but commonly varies from three to five, occasionally six.

== Status and conservation ==
In England, the government's environmental organisation Natural England offers grants towards implementing measures to conserve this species, under the environmental stewardship scheme.

== Sources ==
- Cramp, Stanley; Perrins, C.M., eds. (1994). "Miliaria calandra Corn Bunting". Handbook of the Birds of Europe the Middle East and North Africa. The Birds of the Western Palearctic. Vol. IX: Buntings and New World Warblers. Oxford: Oxford University Press. pp. 323–338. ISBN 978-0-19-854843-0.
