= Daphne Patai =

American scholar and author (born 1943)

- Born: 1943 (age 82–83) in Jerusalem
- Awards: Guggenheim Foundation fellowship; NEH fellowship; National Humanities Center fellowship; Samuel Conti faculty fellowship

Academic background
- Education: University of Wisconsin
- Thesis: Forms of myth in contemporary Brazilian fiction: technique and ideology (1977)

Academic work
- Institutions: University of Massachusetts Amherst
- Main interests: Utopian Studies; higher education; feminism; Brazilian literature and culture

Daphne Patai (born 1943) is an American scholar and author. She is professor emeritus of the Department of Languages, Literatures, and Cultures at the University of Massachusetts Amherst. Her PhD is in Brazilian literature, but her early work also focused on utopian and dystopian fiction. She is the daughter of the anthropologist Raphael Patai.

== Critique of feminist politics ==
After spending ten years with a joint appointment in women's studies and in Portuguese, Patai became highly critical of what she saw as the imposition of a political agenda on educational programs. In Patai's view, this politicization not only debases education, but also threatens the integrity of education generally. Having done, earlier in her career, a good deal of research using personal interview techniques, she drew on these techniques in her book, co-authored with philosopher of science Noretta Koertge, entitled Professing Feminism. Their research included personal interviews with feminist professors who had become disillusioned with feminist initiatives in education. Drawing on these interviews and on materials defining and defending women's studies programs, the book analyzed practices within women's studies that the authors felt were incompatible with serious education and scholarship—above all, the explicit subservience of educational to political aims.

A recent enlarged edition of this book provided extensive documentation from current feminist writings of the continuation, and indeed exacerbation, of these practices. Routinely challenged by feminists who declare that "all education is political," Patai has responded with the claim that this view is simplistic. She argues that a significant difference exists between the reality that education may have political implications and the intentional use of education to indoctrinate. The latter, she argues, is no more acceptable when done by feminists than when done by fundamentalists.

Patai's thesis is that a failure to defend the integrity of education and a habit of dismissing data and research on political grounds, not only seriously hurt students but also leave feminists helpless in trying to defend education against other ideological incursions (such as intelligent design). Only positive knowledge, respect for logic, evidence, and scrupulous scholarship not held to political standards, Patai contends, can lead to a better future. Twentieth-century examples of contrary educational practices have a sordid history, one that has hardly promoted women's rights (or any other human rights).

Among Patai's concerns are what she sees as draconian sexual harassment regulations as implemented in the academic world. She argues that contemporary feminism is poisoned by a strong element of hostility to sexual interaction between men and women and an effort to suppress it through micromanagement of everyday relations. This idea is developed in her 1998 book Heterophobia: Sexual Harassment and the Future of Feminism. Patai has also written about the negative impact of Critical Theory on the study of literature. Together with Will H. Corral she edited Theory's Empire: An Anthology of Dissent (Columbia University Press), a collection of essays by fifty scholars taking issue with Theory orthodoxies of the past few decades.

Patai insists that to criticize feminism and women's studies is not to seek to turn the clock back. From her perspective, she is addressing her critiques to other educators (including feminist educators), in the hope that they will see the importance of defending education from those who want to force it into a particular political mould, regardless of the popularity of particular views at any given moment.

== Other work ==
Patai discovered who wrote the notable feminist dystopian novel Swastika Night and other feminist speculative fiction in the 1930s. That writing was published under the pseudonym of Murray Constantine but written by an English woman named Katharine Burdekin. Patai has been involved in its republication.

In addition to her work on women's studies and feminism, she continues to write about utopian studies and oral history. Many of her opinion pieces have appeared in the Chronicle of Higher Education and in the online magazine Minding the Campus. She serves on the Board of Directors of The Foundation for Individual Rights in Education (FIRE), a non-profit organization devoted to protecting First Amendment rights on college campuses. In 2008 Patai published What Price Utopia? Essays on Ideological Policing, Feminism, and Academic Affairs (Rowman and Littlefield), which brings together her writing on the culture wars of the past two decades and also includes a few new pieces. Her latest book, published in 2010 in Brazil, is a selection of her essays titled Historia Oral, Feminismo e Politica (São Paulo: Letra e Voz).

== Selected published works ==
- Myth and Ideology in Contemporary Brazilian Literature (Associated University Presses, 1983)
- The Orwell Mystique: A Study in Male Ideology (University of Massachusetts Press, 1984)
- Brazilian Women Speak: Contemporary Life Stories (Rutgers University Press, 1988; 1993)
- Women's Words: The Feminist Practice of Oral History (co-edited with Sherna Berger Gluck; Routledge, 1991)
- Rediscovering Forgotten Radicals: British Women Writers 1889-1939 (co-edited with Angela Ingram; University of North Carolina Press, 1993)
- Professing Feminism: Cautionary Tales from the Strange World of Women's Studies (written with Noretta Koertge; Basic Books, 1994)
- Professing Feminism: Education and Indoctrination in Women's Studies (with N. Koertge; new and expanded edition; Lexington Books, 2003)
- Heterophobia: Sexual Harassment and the Future of Feminism (Rowman & Littlefield Publishers, 1998)
- Theory's Empire: An Anthology of Dissent (co-edited with Will H. Corral; Columbia University Press, 2005)
- What Price Utopia? Essays on Ideological Policing, Feminism, and Academic Affairs (Rowman and Littlefield, 2008)
- Historia Oral, Feminismo e Politica (São Paulo: Letra e Voz, 2010).
