= Rowena Cade =

Founder of the Minack Theatre (1893–1983)

- Born: 2 August 1893; Spondon, Derbyshire, England
- Died: 26 March 1983 (aged 89); Porthcurno, Cornwall, England
- Relatives: Katharine Burdekin (sister)

Dorothy Mary Rowena Cade (2 August 1893 – 26 March 1983) was the creator of the Minack Theatre in Porthcurno, Cornwall, UK.

Cade was born in Spondon near Derby on 2 August 1893. She was the older sister of Katharine Burdekin and with her two brothers they lived at The Homestead in Spondon. Rowena Cade's family sold their house in Spondon and Cheltenham and moved to Lamorna in West Penwith, Cornwall after the First World War.

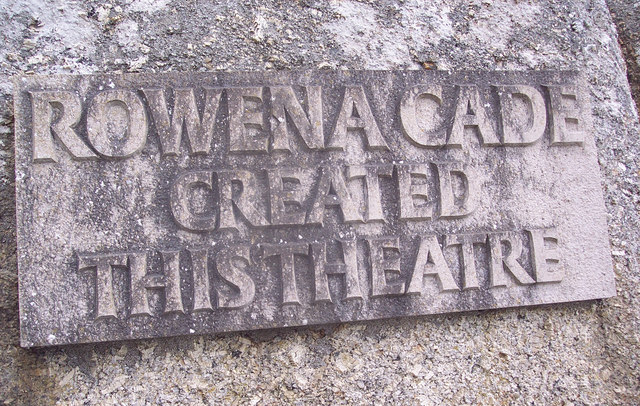
Plaque commemorating the founder and builder of the Minack Theatre

She discovered and bought the Minack headland in the 1920s for £100 and built a house. Her sister's marriage had ended in 1922 and she, and later her partner, also lived in Minack.

After Cade put on a local production of A Midsummer Night’s Dream in 1929, she began searching for a suitable venue for a permanent outdoor stage. The theatre is located on a granite cliff at Porthcurno, near Land’s End.

She built the theatre herself with the help of her gardener Billy Rawlings in 1931–32. The stage took six months to build and the first performance was of Shakespeare's The Tempest in summer 1932. Without any formal lighting, the performance used batteries and car headlights to light the stage.

In 1976, Cade gave the theatre to a charitable trust. She died at Minack House on 26 March 1983. The Cade family continued to be involved in the theatre – the general manager in 2015 was married to Rowena's great niece. The theatre is now managed by Philip Jackson and has featured in a number of BBC programmes about the South West of Britain.
