= Malt Shovel, Spondon =

Listed pub in Derby, England

Malt Shovel
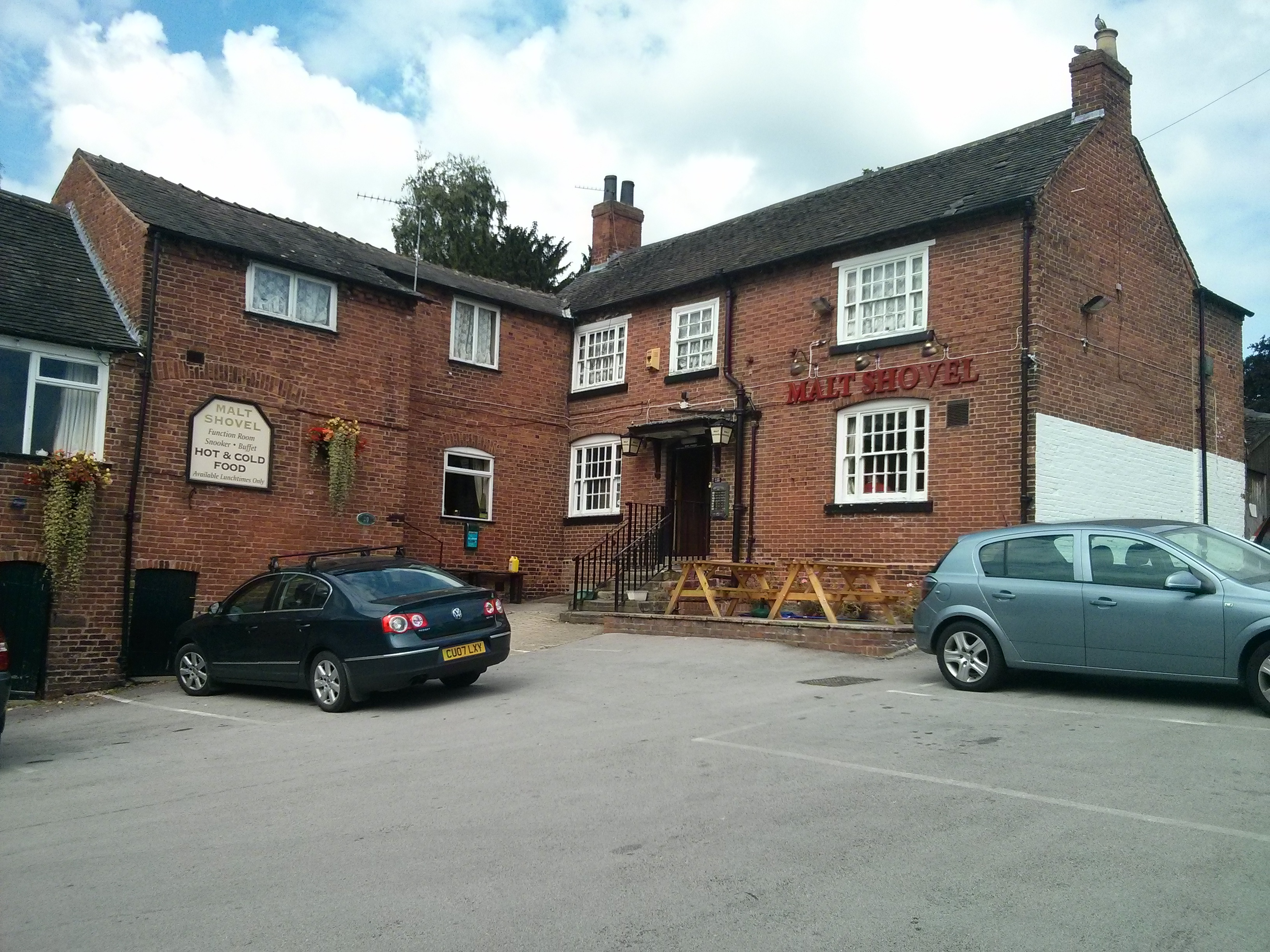
- The pub in 2014

General information
- Type: Public house
- Location: Potter Street, Spondon, Derby, England
- Coordinates: 52.919702°N 1.408509°W
- Year built: Late 18th or early 19th century
- Owner: Marston's

Design and construction
- Designations

Listed Building – Grade II
- Official name: Malt Shovel Inn public house
- Designated: 24 February 1977
- Reference no.: 1228930

The Malt Shovel is a Grade II listed public house on Potter Street in Spondon, a village in the city of Derby, England. Dating largely from the late 18th or early 19th century and incorporating earlier fabric, it retains a notably complete historic interior, including a rare partitioned snug and an unusually intact plan form. The pub is included in the Campaign for Real Ale (CAMRA)'s National Inventory of Historic Pub Interiors with a three-star rating, and its interior is regarded by CAMRA as being of "outstanding national historic importance".

== History ==
In 1333 or 1340, a fire known as "the Great Fire of Spondon" reportedly began at a public house called the Malt Shovel and, driven by strong winds, spread through Spondon, destroying the church and much of the village. Local historians have noted that there is no evidence that the present pub occupies the same site as the 14th-century establishment, although both are associated with the area's malting industry. The current building dates largely from the late 18th or early 19th century, but incorporates earlier fabric, with some parts reportedly dating from 1680.

On 24 February 1977, the Malt Shovel was designated a Grade II listed building. In the early 1990s, the licensees purchased the pub amid concerns that a change of ownership might lead to alterations to the historic interior. They subsequently introduced a kitchen and food service. A former barn to the rear was converted during the late 20th century to provide additional accommodation, including further public rooms and a billiards room.

It was included on the Campaign for Real Ale (CAMRA)'s National Inventory of Historic Pub Interiors before the inventory's grading system was revised. Under the revised scheme, it is rated three stars and its interior is regarded as being "of outstanding national historic importance". As of June 2023, the freehold was owned by Marston's.

== Architecture ==
=== Exterior ===
The building is constructed of red brick and rises to two storeys. The front elevation is arranged with three sash windows, the outer windows being tripartite in form. A simple doorway, accessed by stone steps, has a timber ledged door and a cornice hood supported on brackets. To the left is an attached outbuilding wing projecting towards the road, featuring modillion eaves and an old tiled roof.

=== Interior ===
The interior is notable for retaining its historic plan form, including an off-sales area, a central drinking passage with servery, a rare partitioned snug, a tap room and a separate lounge. The quarry-tiled passage extends through the building to the rear and contains a bar counter with a panelled front and copper top. Evidence of former passage drinking survives in the form of wall-mounted shelving, while the bar-back consists of historic shelving.

The most distinctive feature is a snug formed by a floor-to-ceiling curved glazed partition. The room retains a red-and-black quarry-tiled floor, fixed bench seating and a fireplace dating from the 1920s. The door bears the letter "B", reflecting a former licensing practice in which rooms approved for the consumption of alcohol were identified by letter.

Beyond a low doorway is a small tap room containing another 1920s fireplace and later bench seating. The lounge, accessed via the servery, retains fixed seating and a brick fireplace dating from the mid-20th century. A disused doorway indicates that the room was formerly accessed directly from the drinking passage.

The former barn was converted during the 1990s to create two additional public rooms, including the Tudor Room and a larger room containing a full-sized billiards table.

== Gallery ==
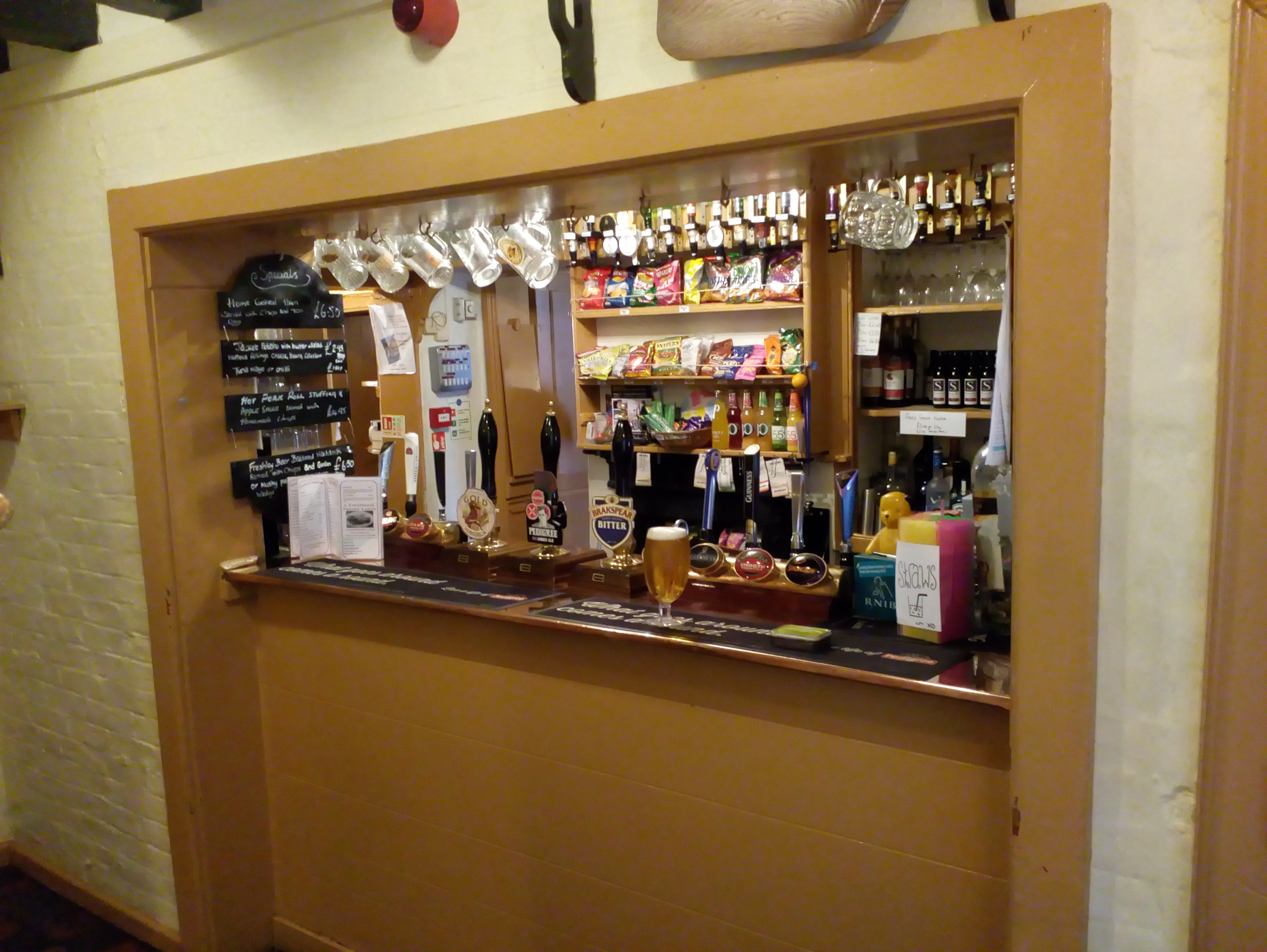
The bar in 2017

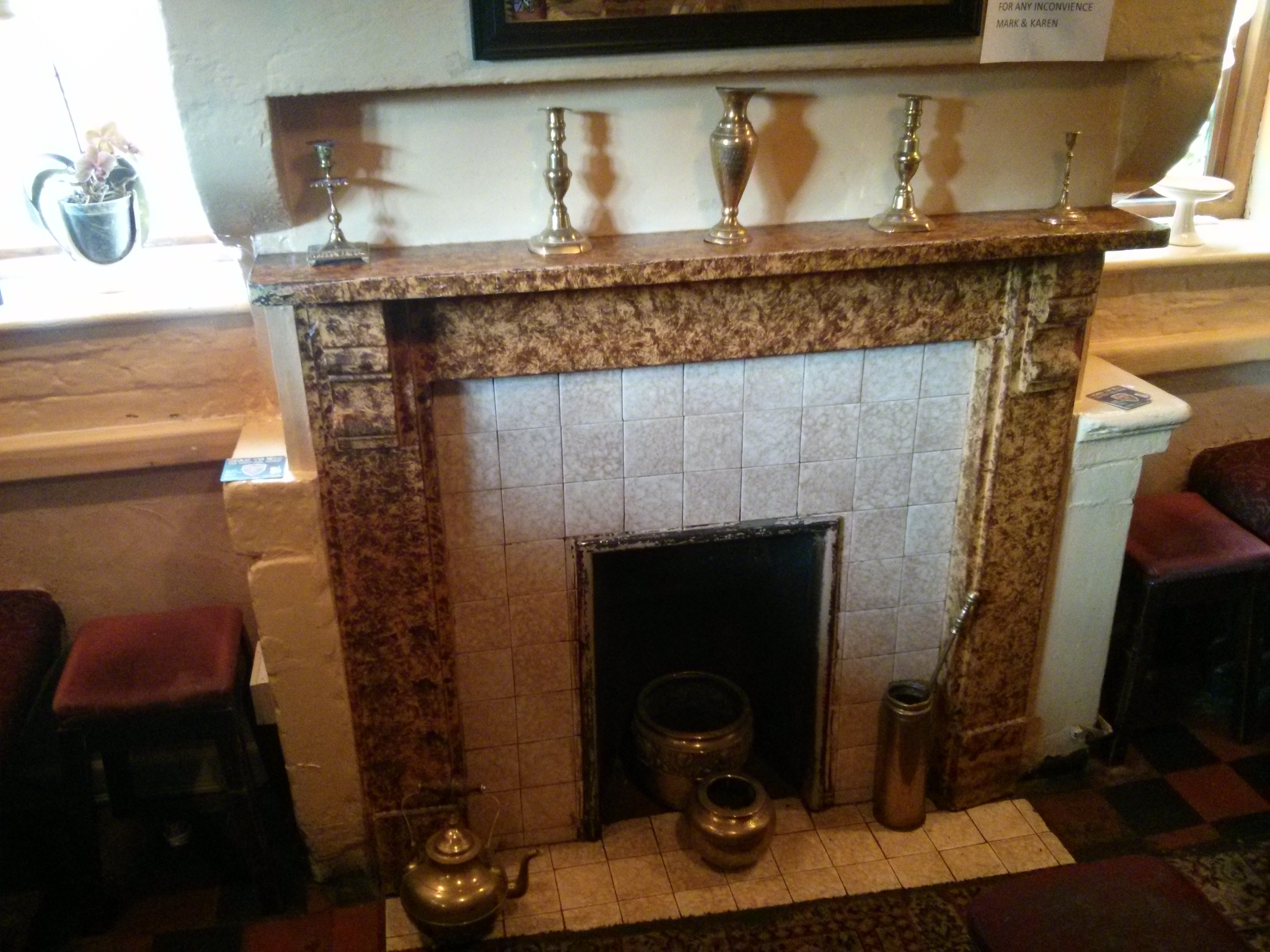
The 1920s hearth from snug "B"

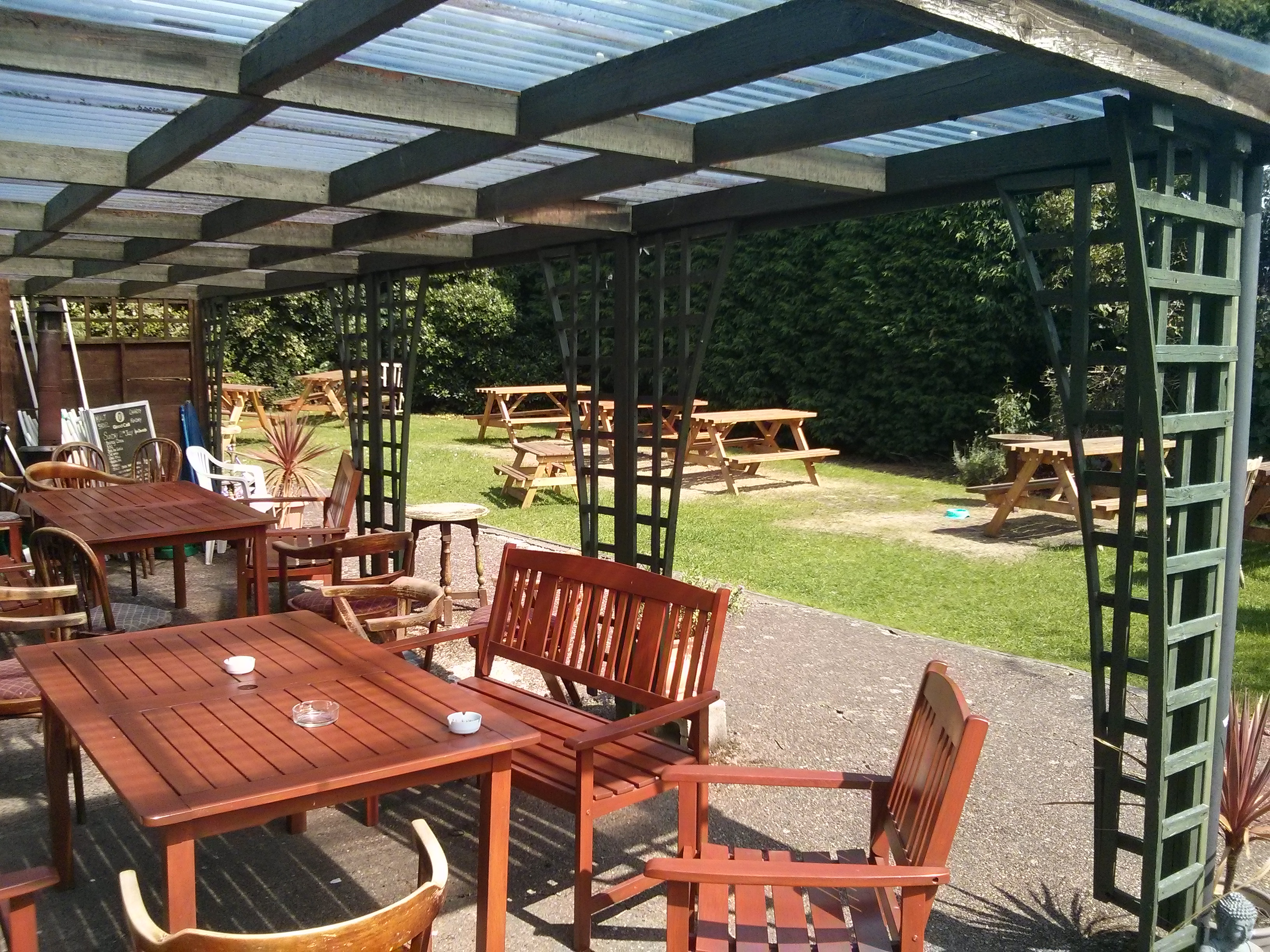
The beer garden

== See also ==
- Listed buildings in Spondon
