= Frederick Augustus Voigt =

British journalist and author (1892–1957)

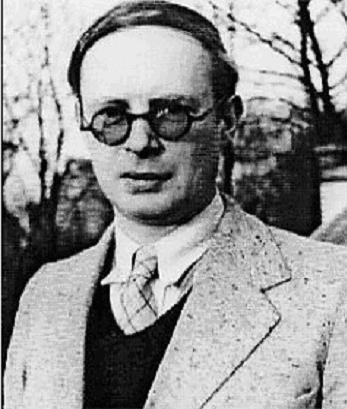
Frederick Augustus Voigt

Frederick Augustus Voigt (9 May 1892 – 8 January 1957) was a British journalist and author of German descent, most famous for his work with the Manchester Guardian and his opposition to dictatorship and totalitarianism on the European continent.

== Life ==
Voigt was born in Hampstead, London, on 9 May 1892, the fourth child of Ludwig Voigt, a wine merchant, and Helene Hoffmann. Both his parents had been born in Germany, but became naturalised British subjects before his birth. He therefore grew up in a multi-lingual household, spent summer holidays in France and Germany and became fluent in both French and German.

Voigt was educated at Haberdashers' Aske's Boys' School and Birkbeck College, London, where he at first studied biology before abandoning the natural sciences for literature and modern languages. In 1915 he graduated with a first-class honours degree in old and modern Germanic languages from King's College London, and he worked briefly as a schoolmaster, teaching German, French, botany and zoology at the "New School", Abbotsholme, Derbyshire.

In 1916 Voigt was called up for military service in the First World War and spent nearly three years in the British Army, two of them on the Western Front. Out of this experience came his first published work, a book of memoirs of his war service based on his diaries and letters home from the front, entitled Combed Out (1920).

In May 1919 Voigt joined the advertising department of the Manchester Guardian and the following year was dispatched by the editor, C. P. Scott, to act as assistant to the newspaper's Berlin Correspondent, J. G. Hamilton. From 1920 until 1933 Voigt was the Manchester Guardian’s correspondent in Germany, reporting on political, social and economic conditions under the Weimar Republic. He threw himself wholeheartedly into the vibrant cultural and social scene of Weimar Germany and developed valuable contacts at all levels of German society and particularly on the left of German politics. In 1926 he scored a journalistic coup with his disclosures about the secret collaboration of the Reichswehr and the Soviet military authorities in direct contravention of the military clauses of the Treaty of Versailles, disclosures that sparked a major domestic and diplomatic crisis for the German Government.

Although based in Berlin, Voigt travelled widely throughout Germany, reporting on political and social conditions in the provinces and also ventured further afield in Central and Eastern Europe, taking a particular interest in the political conditions within Poland. His particular interest was in the exposure of political repression and state terror and he caused a sensation with his reports on Polish attacks on the Ukrainian minority in eastern Poland.

Voigt was among the first British journalists to bring attention to the threat to Germany and Europe posed by the nascent National Socialist (Nazi) movement and from 1930 he was an implacable opponent of Hitler and the Nazis. Nevertheless, like many British intellectuals, he failed to predict the Nazi seizure of power, confidently predicting as late as December 1932 that the German left would never allow the Nazis to take power.

Voigt was transferred from Berlin to Paris in the first months of 1933 and then moved back to London in September 1934 where he took up the position of diplomatic correspondent for the Manchester Guardian, a post specially created for him. However, he continued to write on Central and Eastern Europe throughout the 1930s and with the help of German émigrés and a Swiss agent named Wolf he built up a confidential news network that made him one of the few reliable sources of information about what was really happening within Germany under the Nazi regime.

Between 1935 and 1939 Voigt broadcast fortnightly talks on foreign affairs for the BBC and from 1938 to 1946 he was editor of The Nineteenth Century and After, and from January to June 1939 he edited a newsletter called The Arrow. His assessment of the totalitarian dictatorships, Unto Caesar, was published in 1938 and marked a shift in Voigt's political thinking. In January 1940 he left the Manchester Guardian to join the Department of Propaganda in Enemy Countries, where he worked as German advisor to the British psychological warfare department.

At that time, Voigt used his contacts in the Secret Intelligence Service to help his Polish friend Krystyna Skarbek (subsequently also known by the nom de guerre, Christine Granville) overcome British official skepticism about her wish to help the war effort. She eventually entered upon a wartime undercover career with the Special Operations Executive, winning fame with her exploits in Hungary, Poland and France.

After the Second World War, Voigt devoted himself to writing and published several books on foreign affairs and European politics, including Pax Britannica (1949) and The Greek Sedition (1949).

Despite not being conventionally good-looking with his thinning hair and thick glasses, Voigt seems to have been something of a "ladies' man" and was married three times. He married his fellow journalist, the American Margaret Goldsmith (with whom he collaborated on a biography of Paul von Hindenburg in 1930) in 1926, but she divorced him in 1935. The same year he married Hungarian violinist Janka Radnitz, with whom he had a daughter, Evelyn Elizabeth, but the marriage was eventually dissolved. In 1944 he married Annie Rachel Bennett.

Voigt died peacefully in hospital in Guildford, Surrey, on 8 January 1957, aged 64. At the time of his death he was working on a follow-up to Unto Caesar, to be entitled In the Beginning.

== Politics ==
Voigt was described by his former tutor in 1919 as “a first-rate and rather old-fashioned liberal”, and, as befitted the German Correspondent of a left-leaning liberal, if non-partisan, newspaper, Voigt was a champion of individual liberty and democracy. He worked closely with many on the left of German and Eastern European politics in the 1920s and 1930s, was a supporter of the Weimar Republic and broadly opposed to the post-war peace settlement, which he regarded as unfair and too harsh. He was a staunch and implacable opponent of injustice and the use of coercion and state terrorism, a crusading journalist determined to expose the cruelty and injustice meted out to the oppressed peoples and minorities of Central and Eastern Europe. He was also sceptical about the ability of the League of Nations to solve international disputes.

However, after the Nazi seizure of power, Voigt became disillusioned with the German left, which he believed had ignominiously given up in the face of Nazi pressure. He came to regard the two dominant totalitarian ideologies as being the abiding evils and threats to European civilization of the day and moved away from his former scientific materialism and returned to the Anglicanism of his youth. He came to regard both Fascism/Nazism and Communism as pseudo-religious ideologies that seriously threatened the essentially Christian civilization of Europe, and could only be opposed if the Western democracies committed to defend that civilization.

After World War II he became a leading exponent of what George Orwell termed “neo-toryism”, regarding the maintenance of British imperial power as an invaluable bulwark against Communism and as being indispensable to the creation and continuation of international peace and political stability. He also became a fierce critic of the communist Czechoslovak expulsions and murders of German citizens after the war, most notably in the 1953 book Documents on the Expulsion of the Sudeten Germans for which he wrote the foreword.

== Major works ==
In addition to his prolific journalism during the interwar years, Voigt published a number of books, including a volume of war memoirs, translations of works on German politics and foreign affairs and The Greek Sedition, a study of the international situation based on the visits he made to post-war Greece between 1946 and 1950. However, his two major works—key to understanding his late political views—are Unto Caesar (1938) and Pax Britannica (1949).

The central thesis of Unto Caesar is that Communism and National Socialism were "revolutionary secular religions arising from the arrogant endeavour of man to transform religious promises directly into worldly reality" (Markus Huttner). Voigt argues that such "secular religions" pose a threat to the fundamentals of European civilization by seeking to "render to Caesar what is God's" and can only be defeated if the western democracies, particularly Britain, stand up and actively defend Christianity and Civilization against the totalitarian onslaught.

In Pax Britannica, Voigt set out his views as to how the post-war world should be ordered, placing particular emphasis on the role that Britain should play in the new world order. He argued that the continuance of British imperial power was essential to stem the tide of Communist revolution and maintain peace and stability in what was termed the Third World. Furthermore, he believed a strong Britain and a rehabilitated Germany were essential to prevent Soviet expansion in Europe, and that British foreign policy should have three main principles: the maintenance of the balance of power in Europe, ensuring the independence of all her neighbours and "armed strength, and readiness, upon just cause, to fight".

== Bibliography ==
- Combed Out (1920)
- Ein Engländer über Oberschlesien (1921)
- Hindenburg: The Man and Legend (with Margaret Goldsmith) (1930)
- Unto Caesar. New York: G. P. Putnam's Sons. 1938 – via Internet Archive. (new edition 1939)
- Pax Britannica. London: Constable and Co., Ltd. 1949 – via Internet Archive.
- The Greek Sedition. London: Hollis and Carter. 1949 – via Internet Archive.
