= Roger de Bankwell =

- Born: <1333
- Died: >1340
- Occupation: Judge

Roger de Bankwell (c. 1340), judge, perhaps of the same family as John de Bankwell, was one of three commissioners entrusted with the assessment of the tallage in Nottinghamshire and Derbyshire in 1333, and a member of another commission directed to inquire into the circumstances connected with a fire which had recently occurred at Spondon in Derbyshire, the sufferers by which prayed temporary exemption from taxation on account of their losses. He appears as a counsel in the Year book for 1340, in 1341 was appointed to a justiceship of the king's bench, and was one of those assigned to try petitions from Gascony, Wales, Ireland, Scotland, and 'other foreign parts ' between the years 1341 and 1347.
