= St Werburgh's Church, Spondon =

The Parish Church of St Werburgh, Spondon
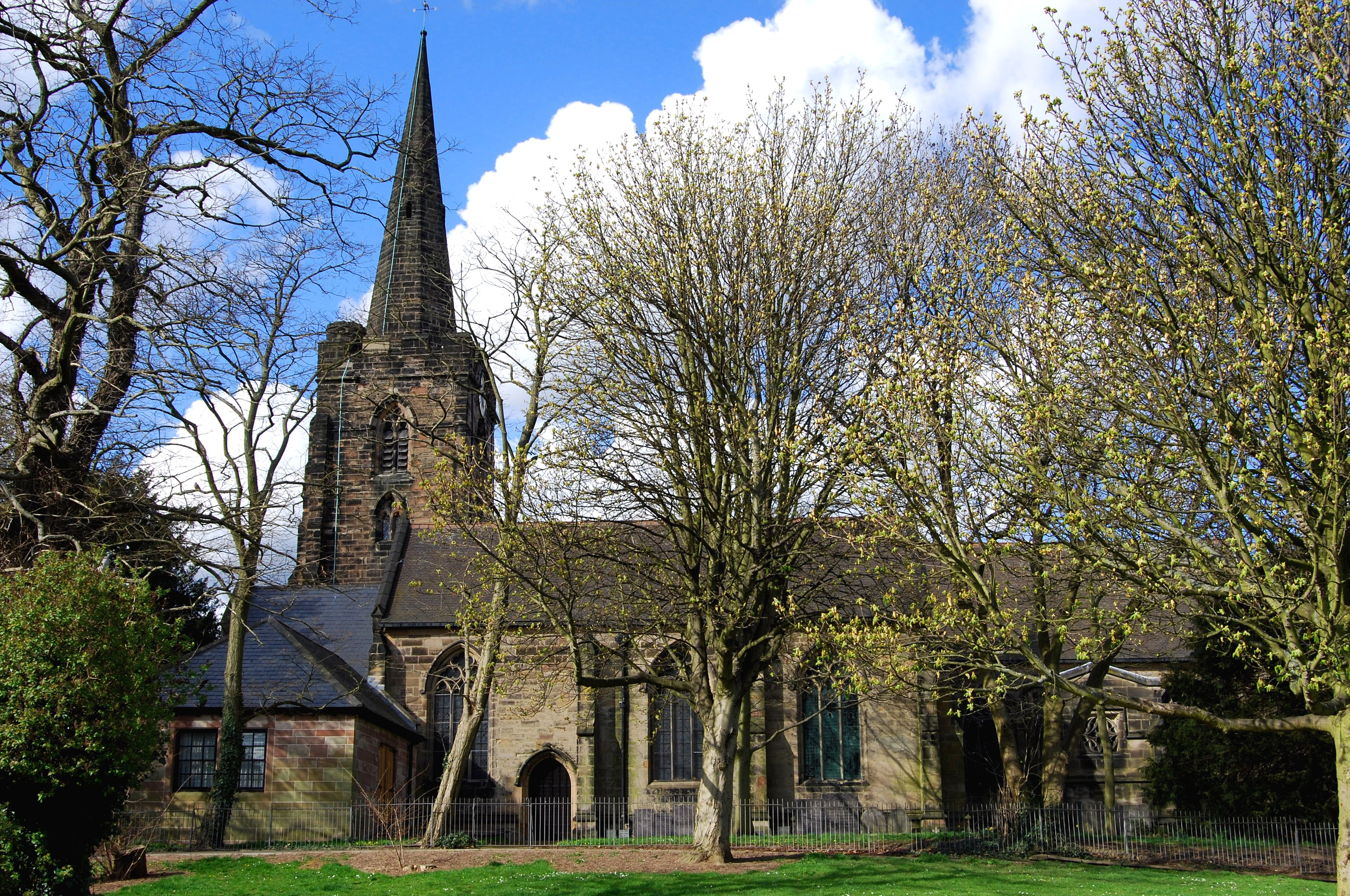
- The Parish Church of St Werburgh, Spondon
- 52.91915°N 1.40977°W
- Country: England
- Denomination: Church of England
- Churchmanship: Inclusive Anglo-Catholic
- Website: www.stwerburgh.com

History
- Dedication: St. Werburgh

Architecture
- Heritage designation: Grade II listed building
- Architectural type: Gothic
- Completed: 1390

Administration
- Province: Canterbury
- Diocese: Diocese of Derby
- Parish: Spondon

Clergy
- Vicar: Canon Julian Hollywell

St. Werburgh's Church, Spondon, is a parish church in the Inclusive Anglo-Catholic tradition of the Church of England located in Spondon, Derbyshire.

== History ==
The present church dates from around 1390, when it replaced an earlier church destroyed by fire in 1340. It was re-listed as Grade II in 2012.

The main body of the church, both nave and chancel, along with the 35 metre high tower and spire, date to 1390, although the north wall of the nave was damaged by subsidence and was rebuilt in 1826.

The church was restored in 1892 which removed many of the changes made in 1826. The flat roof of 1826 was replaced with a pitched roof, and other roofs were raised in height. The north aisle was rebuilt and the exterior wall was moved out by 5 ft. Plaster from the walls and the pillars was removed, to reveal the original stonework. The arch under the tower was opened up, and the galleries were removed. The architect was John Oldrid Scott of London, and the contractor was Rudd of Grantham.

There have been recent extensive renovations to the tower and spire funded partly through Heritage Lottery funding. The Nave floor repaired and the entire church reordered, removing pews for a cafe area, reorienting remaining pews around a permanent central altar, which was made for the church as a memorial to those lost through the COVID pandemic. This altar was consecrated by the Bishop of Derby in 2024.

The Reverend TEM Barber was vicar from March 1939 until May 1986 and is known to have been the longest serving vicar in the Church of England at that time, and also the longest-ever serving vicar of Spondon.

During his time as vicar, the church congregations flourished. He taught strictly from the Book of Common Prayer with High Church ritual, and was renowned for his work with the sick and dying, and for his work with young people. One of his greatest works was with the Spondon Church Boys' Club, which he founded in 1939 and ran until his death in 1988. A feature of the club was the annual summer camp to various venues, but latterly to Sidmouth. Following his resignation due to ill health at the age of 79 he was, thanks to his many friends, able to continue to run Spondon Church Boys' Club until his death two years later. His funeral was packed by his parishioners, past and present, whom he had served for 50 years.

The church today is part of the Inclusive Church Network and continues to be a thriving and diverse community centred on relaxed ordered worship with a strong choral tradition, including a treble choir of over 17 children. The church community also benefits from the oldest continuous Mothers' Union in the Diocese of Derby which still regularly meets.

== Features ==
Adjacent to the main altar is a recessed sedilia, nearby a priest's sanctus window and there are four piscinas within the church.

There is a First World War memorial located in the north aisle and a Lady Chapel restored to the south aisle. A new vestry is located in the tower. The royal arms displayed over the north door is dated between 1702 and 1707 because it displays the arms of Queen Anne before the union with Scotland.

Externally can be found the remains of a decorated cross shaft said to date to around 870, though it was not originally located in the churchyard.

In the nearby former vicarage grounds, which are now private property, is what is considered to be a holy well.

== Bells ==
There is a peal of six bells, one of which is 16th century, one 17th, and the remaining four of the 19th century.

== Organ ==
A new organ was installed and opened by W.E. Gover of St Werburgh's Church, Derby on 21 April 1839.

The organ by the builder James Jepson Binns was opened on 14 June 1905 and has a case by John Oldrid Scott. The total cost was £1,100 (equivalent to £115,640 in 2025). The electric action was fitted by M.C. Thompson in 1989. A specification of the organ can be found on the National Pipe Organ Register.

== See also ==
- Listed buildings in Spondon
