= Adrienne Thomas (novelist) =

German novelist

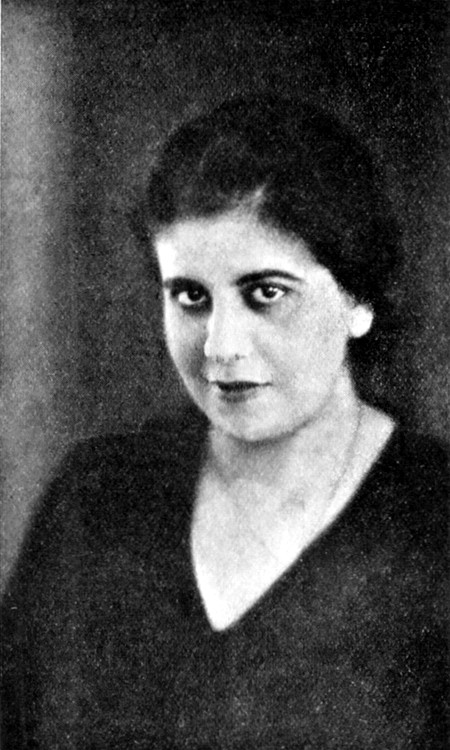
Adrienne Thomas in 1934

Adrienne Thomas was the pseudonym of Hertha A. Deutsch, nee Strauch (1897–1980), a German autobiographical novelist.

== Life ==
Hertha Strauch was born in St Avold in Alsace-Lorraine, then part of Germany, on 24 June 1897. She grew up bilingual in German and French, going to school in Metz, where her family owned a small department store. During World War I she became a nurse for the Red Cross, at first in Metz and later in Berlin, where her family moved. During the 1920s she trained as a singer and actor at the Clara Lion Conservatory in Frankfurt.

Writing as Adrienne Thomas, she drew on her Red Cross experiences for her semi-autobiographical anti-war novel Die Katrin wird Soldat (Katrin Becomes a Soldier), the diary of a young Jewish girl serving behind the German lines as a relief worker. Published in 1930, the book was translated into sixteen languages.

When Adolf Hitler came to power in 1933, Thomas was forced to go into exile, and her writings were banned. After living in Austria, France and the United States, she eventually settled in Vienna in 1947.

== Works ==
- Die Katrin wird Soldat: Ein Roman aus Elsass-Lothringen, Berlin: Propyläen, 1930
  - Translated by Margaret L. Goldsmith as Cathérine Joins Up, London: E. Mathews & Marrot, Ltd., 1931; Katrin becomes a Soldier, Boston: Little, Brown, 1931
- Dreiviertel Neugier: Roman, 1934
- Katrin! Die Welt brennt!: Roman, 1936
  - Translated by Marguerite Wolff as Child of Unrest, London: Hutchinston & Co., 1937
- Andrea: eine Erzählung von jungen Menschen , 1937
- Von Johanna zu Jane: Roman, 1939
- Reisen Sie ab, Mademoiselle!, 1940
- Ein Fenster am East River, 1947
- Wettlauf mit dem Traum: Roman, 1949
- Da und dort, 1950
