= Listed buildings in Spondon =

Spondon is an electoral ward in the city of Derby, England. The ward contains 17 listed buildings that are recorded in the National Heritage List for England. Of these, one is listed at Grade I, the highest of the three grades, one is at Grade II*, the middle grade, and the others are at Grade II, the lowest grade. The ward contains the former village of Spondon, which is now a suburb to the east of the centre of Derby. The listed buildings are all near the centre of the original village. Most of them are houses, cottages and associated structures, and the others include a church, a public house, a boundary post, a group of almshouses, and a school.

== Key ==
Grade	Criteria
I	Buildings of exceptional interest, sometimes considered to be internationally important
II*	Particularly important buildings of more than special interest
II	Buildings of national importance and special interest

== Buildings ==
Name and location	Photograph	Date	Notes	Grade
St Werburgh's Church; 52.91921°N 1.40940°W		14th century	The church has been altered and extended during the centuries, particularly in 1825–27, and again in 1891–92 by John Oldrid Scott. It is built in stone, and consists of a nave, north and south aisles, north and south porches, a chancel and a west steeple. The steeple has a tower with buttresses and a recessed spire.	II
The Grange; 52.92054°N 1.41022°W	—	16th century	The cottage, which has been much altered, is timber framed with plaster panels and a tile roof. There is a single storey and attic, a doorway with a cambered head, casement windows, and gabled dormers.	II
44 Sitwell Street; 52.91952°N 1.40526°W		Early 18th century	A red brick house with stone dressings, a floor band, a dentilled eaves band, and a tile roof. There are two storeys and attics, and four bays, the middle two bays projecting and taller. In the centre is a porch with a coped gable containing a round-arched window on the front and a doorway in the left return. To the right is a doorway with a moulded surround, most of the windows are sashes with segmental heads, and in the centre are two gabled dormers.	II
The Homestead and gatepiers 52.91924°N 1.40603°W		1740	The house, which is Georgian style, is in red brick with stone dressings and quoins, and at the top is a stone cornice, a brick parapet with stone capping, and an open pediment. There are three storeys and five bays, the middle bay projecting slightly. Eight moulded stone steps with wrought iron balustrades lead up to the central doorway that has Doric columns, a round-headed fanlight and a triglyph frieze. The window above the doorway has fluted Ionic pilasters, a round head and massive sill brackets, and over that is a round-headed window with an architrave. The other windows are sashes with flat brick arches and fluted stone keystones. At the rear is a Venetian stair window and a square porch. At the entrance to the grounds are square rusticated gate piers with acorn finials.	I
Pair of gateways, Spondon School; 52.92086°N 1.41177°W		18th century	The gateways originally led to Field House, which has been demolished. They are in rusticated stone, and each gateway consists of a round-headed arch with archivolts, and upright consoles on pilasters at the side. At the top is a vermiculated keystone, a cornice and a pediment.	II*
Former Coach House; The Homestead; 52.91928°N 1.40549°W	—	18th century	The former coach house is in red brick, and has tile roofs with shaped coped gables. It contains a doorway with side lights and a balcony, and mullioned casement windows with segmental heads. On the roof is a lantern with an ogee lead roof and a wind vane.	II
25 Park Road; 52.92067°N 1.41058°W	—	Late 18th century	A red brick house with modillion eaves and a tile roof. There are three storeys and one bay. The doorway has a plain surround, there is one sash window, and the other windows are replacements.	II
Holly House; 52.92070°N 1.41014°W	—	Late 18th century	The house is in red brick on a plinth, with modillion eaves, and a tile roof. There are two storeys and three bays. On the front is a gabled porch, the windows are mullioned, and they contain two cast iron lights with lozenge-pattern glazing.	II
Longdon's Row; 52.92039°N 1.40893°W	—	Late 18th century	A row of five cottages in painted red brick with tile roofs and two storeys. No. 30 is the oldest, and Nos. 31–35 date from the early 19th century. No. 30 has three bays, and contains a bay window and casement windows. The other four cottages project, they have a single bay and each has a doorway with a plain surround and sash windows.	II
Prospect House; 52.92066°N 1.41066°W	—	Late 18th century	The house is in red brick on a plinth, with a floor band, a modillion cornice and a blocking course. There are two storeys and four bays. The doorway has a moulded surround and a three-light rectangular fanlight. The windows are the front are sashes with brick wedge lintels, and on the right return is a two-storey canted bay window and round-headed windows.	II
Vicarage; 52.9193°N 1.41024°W	—	Late 18th century	The vicarage, which incorporates older material at the rear, is in red brick on a plinth, with bold lined eaves, and a hipped slate roof. There are two storeys and three bays. In the centre is a porch with a cornice hood, and the windows are sashes with flat brick arches.	II
Malt Shovel Inn; 52.91996°N 1.40755°W		Late 18th to early 19th century	The public house, with a core probably from the early 18th century, is in red brick with modillion eaves and a tile roof. There are two storeys and three bays. Steps lead up to the doorway that has a cornice hood on brackets. The windows are sashes, those in the outer bays tripartite, and those in the ground floor with segmental heads. A range of outbuildings on the left extends towards the road.	II
The Old Farm and 31–35 Church Hill; 52.91942°N 1.40867°W	—	Late 18th or early 19th century	The farmhouse and flanking houses are in red brick with stone dressings and roofs in tile or slate. The farmhouse has three storeys and three bays. In the centre is a square porch and the windows are sashes, those in the lower two floors with channelled wedge lintels, and in the top floor rising into gabled dormers. In No. 31, to the right, is a segmental-headed carriage arch, steps leading up to a doorway that has a fanlight and a cornice hood, and a circular window, and further to the right is an oriel window. Elsewhere, the windows are a mix of sashes and casements, and most of the doorways have been altered.	II
Boundary post 52.90899°N 1.38978°W		Early 19th century	The boundary post is on the south side of Derby Road (A6005 road). It is in cast iron and has a triangular section and a sloping top. The east side is inscribed "OCKBROOK PARISH", the west side "SPONDON PARISH" and on the sloping top is "PARISH BOUNDARY".	II
Bowes House; 52.92189°N 1.40648°W	—	Early 19th century	The house is in red brick with stone dressings, a moulded eaves cornice, and a Welsh slate roof. There are two storeys and three bays. The central doorway has panelled pilasters, a fanlight and a hood, and the windows are sashes with rusticated wedge lintels. To the right is a conservatory.	II
Barrow's Almshouses; 52.92230°N 1.41012°W		1873	The almshouses are in red brick, with dressings in blue brick and painted stone, and a slate roof. There is a single storey and attics, and a symmetrical front of nine bays. The centre is gabled and projects slightly, containing a doorway with a strapwork hood, flanked by single-light windows, over which is an inscribed and dated panel in a pointed-arched surround with a hood mould. Two of the outer bays are gabled and contain double doorways, the windows are casements, and all the openings have chamfered surrounds.	II
St Werburgh's Primary School; 52.92204°N 1.40729°W		c. 1900	The school is in red brick with stone dressings and a tile roof, on which is a square wooden cupola. The front facing the road is gabled, and contains a large round-headed window with six lights and small-pane casements, over which is a moulded brick hood. Projecting to the front are two octagonal pavilions with hipped roofs, and behind are the classroom ranges.	II
