= Margaret L. Goldsmith =

American novelist

Margaret Leland Goldsmith (1894–1971) was an American journalist, historical novelist and translator who lived and worked primarily in England. She translated Erich Kästner's Emil and the Detectives for the first UK edition.

== Life ==
Goldsmith spent some of her childhood in Germany, where she attended school and learned to speak German fluently. She then studied at Illinois Woman's College in Jacksonville, Illinois and gained an MA from the University of Illinois. During World War I she was on the staff of the war trade board under Bernard Baruch. She then worked for the national chamber of commerce in Washington and the international chamber of commerce in Paris, helping Wesley Clair Mitchell with his 1919 report on international price comparisons. Returning to Berlin as a research assistant in the office of the commercial attaché of the American Embassy, she became in 1923 one of the first women to be appointed an assistant trade commissioner, resigning the post in 1925. In 1926 she married Frederick Voigt, the Manchester Guardian's diplomatic correspondent in Berlin in the 1920s and 1930s. While living in Berlin she worked as an agent representing English-speaking authors. In spring 1928 she had a short affair in Berlin with Vita Sackville-West. She divorced Voigt in 1935.

Goldsmith was a friend of Katharine Burdekin, helping her over depression in 1938 by providing her with research notes on Marie Antoinette. The outcome was a historical novel, Venus in Scorpio, co-authored by Goldsmith and Burdekin (as 'Murray Constantine').

== Works ==
=== Novels ===
- Karin's mother, New York: Payson & Clarke Ltd, 1928
- Belated Adventure, London: Jonathan Cape, 1929
- Ein Fremder in Paris: Roman (A stranger in Paris: novel), Leipzig: Paul List, 1930.
- Patience geht vorüber: ein Roman, Berlin: Kindt & Bucher Verlag, 1931; Berlin: AvivA Verlag, 2020, ed. by Eckhard Gruber, ISBN 978-3-932338-94-6
- (with Murray Constantine) Venus in Scorpio: a romance of Versailles, 1770-1793, 1940

=== Non-fiction ===
- Frederick the Great, 1929
- (with Frederick Voigt) Hindenburg: the man and the legend, 1930
- Count Zeppelin, a biography, 1931.
- Christina of Sweden, a psychological biography, 1933
- Franz Anton Mesmer: the history of an idea, 1934
- Seven women against the world, 1935
- John the Baptist. A modern interpretation, 1935. With wood engravings by John Farleigh.
- Maria Theresa of Austria, 1936.
- Joseph, 1937
- Florence Nightingale, the woman and the legend, 1937
- Sappho of Lesbos : a psychological reconstruction of her life, 1938
- Madame de Stael: portrait of a liberal in the revolutionary age, 1938
- The trail of opium: the eleventh plague, 1939
- Women at War, 1943
- The Road to Penicillin: a history of chemotherapy, 1946
- Women and the Future, 1946
- Soho Square, 1947. Illustrated by John Greene.
- Studies in aggression, 1948.
- The wandering portrait, 1954.

=== Translations ===
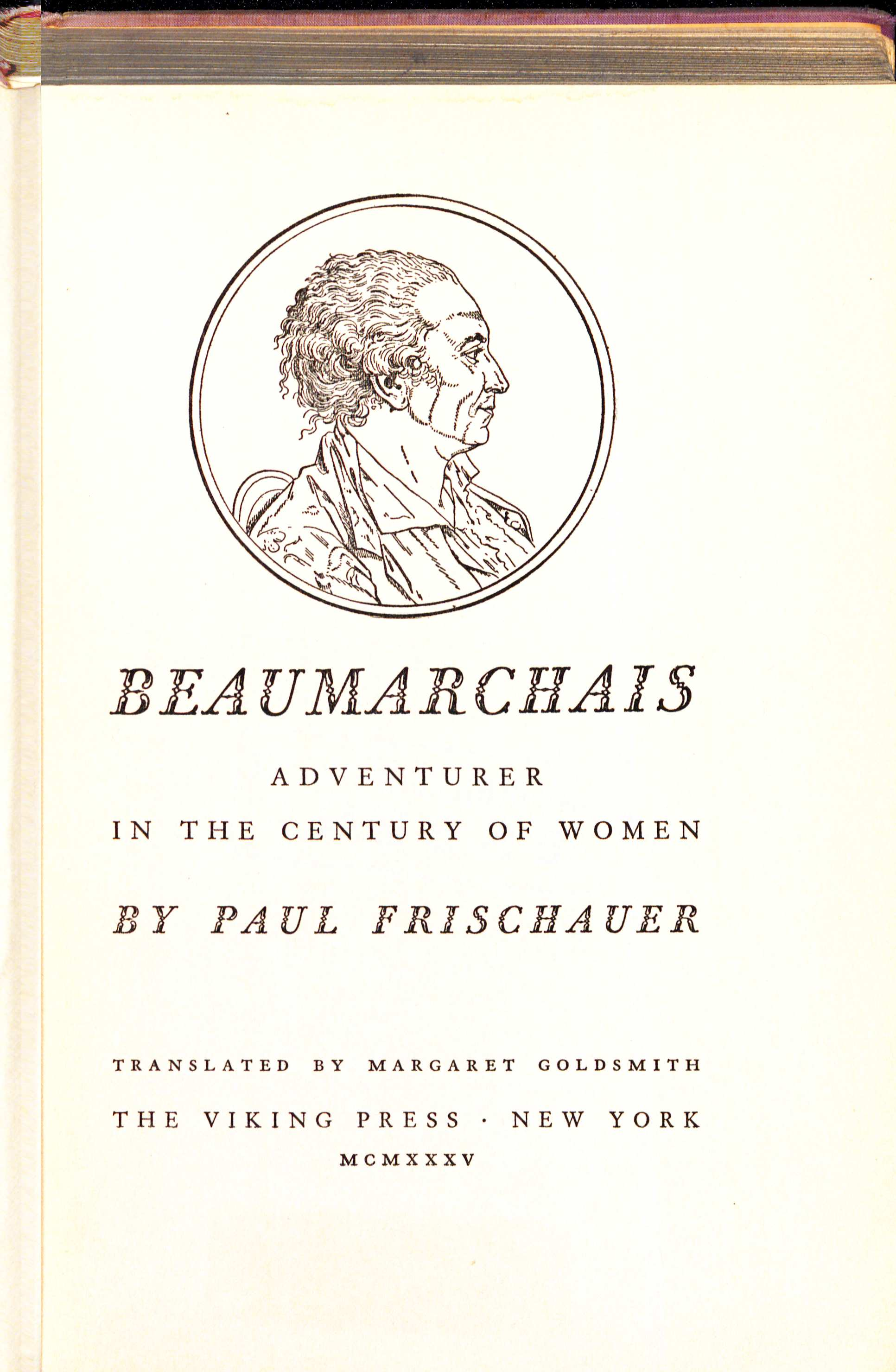
Paul Frischauer Beaumarchais, adventurer in the century of women, 1935

- America seen through German eyes by Arthur Feiler, 1928.
- The revolt of the fishermen by Anna Seghers, London: E. Mathews & Marrot, 1929. Translated from the German Aufstand der Fischer von St. Barbara.
- Matka Boska. Mother of God by Cécile Ines Loos, 1930. Translated from the German.
- Results of an accident by Vicki Baum. London: Geoffrey Bles, 1931. Translated from the German Zwischenfall in Lohwinckel.
- Emil and the detectives by Erich Kästner. With an introduction by Walter De la Mare, and drawings by Sax. London: Jonathan Cape, 1931.
- Cathérine joins up by Adrienne Thomas, 1931. Translated from the German Die Katrin wird Soldat.
- Das Kind aus Saal IV by Hertha von Gebhardt, 1932. Translated from the German Das Kind aus Saal IV
- They Call it Patriotism by Bruno Brehm, 1932. Translated from the German Api und Este.
- Matka Boska. Mother of God by Bruno Brehm, 1932. Translated from the German.
- The wheel of life: a novel by Hermynia Zur Mühlen, 1933. Translated from the German Das Riesenrad.
- The station master: a novel by Oskar Maria Graf, 1933. Translated from the German Bolwieser
- Why I Left Germany. By a German Jewish Scientist, 1934. Translated from the German.
- Frail Safety by Heinrich Herm, 1934. Translated from the German Moira: Roman.
- Beaumarchais, adventurer in the century of women by Paul Frischauer, 1935.
- Return to Reality, and other stories by Gina Kaus, 1935.
- Myself a Goddess. A new biography of Isabella of Spain by Alma Wittlin, 1936. Translated from the German Isabella.
- Outcasts. A novel by Elisabeth Augustin, 1937. Translated from the Dutch Moord en doodslag in Wolhynie and De Uitgestootene.
- Wilhelm Furtwängler: a biography by Curt Riess, 1955. Translated from the German Furtwängler. Musik und Politik.
