= Noretta Koertge =

American philosopher

Education
- Education: University of London
- Thesis: A study of relations between scientific theories: a test of the general correspondence principle (1969)

Philosophical work
- Era: Contemporary philosophy
- Region: Western philosophy
- School: Analytic philosophy
- Institutions: Indiana University Bloomington
- Main interests: History and philosophy of science

Noretta Koertge is an American philosopher of science noted for her work on Karl Popper and scientific rationality.

== Career ==
She worked since 1981 as a Professor in the Department of History and Philosophy of Science at Indiana University and is now an Emeritus Professorship. She was editor-in-chief of the journal (1999–2004) Philosophy of Science, her election as a Fellow, in 1999, by American Association for the Advancement of Science and her being Editor-in-Chief of The New Dictionary of Scientific Biography (2004–2008). She is also a novelist.

== Selected publications ==
- Patai, Daphne; Koertge, Noretta (1994). Professing feminism: Cautionary tales from the strange world of women's studies. New York: Basic Books. ISBN 978-0-465-09821-7. OCLC 30544826.
- Koertge, Noretta, ed. (1998). A house built on sand: Exposing postmodernist myths about science. Oxford University Press. ISBN 978-0-19-802776-8.

=== Novels ===
- Koertge, Noretta (1981). Who was that masked woman. New York: St. Martin's Press. ISBN 0-312-87033-7. OCLC 7206437.
- Koertge, Noretta (1984). Valley of the Amazons. St. Martin's Press. ISBN 978-0-312-83608-5.
