= Lawrence Shove =

British sound recordist (1923–1995)

- Born: Lawrence Clive Shove; 5 November 1923; British India
- Died: 2 April 1995 (aged 71); Dunsford, Exeter, England
- Occupations: Sound recordist; Theatre manager
- Years active: 1960s-1980s

Eurasian Bittern
Shove's 1966 recording of a booming Bittern (with other birdsong in the foreground)

Lawrence Clive Shove (5 November 1923 – 2 April 1995) was a British sound recordist, specialising in field recordings of wildlife.

The "Shove collection of British wildlife" at the National Sound Archive (NSA), part of the British Library comprises 243 reels of his recordings, on magnetic tape. In 1969, Shove was one of the first contributors to the NSA's wildlife collection, and their wildlife recording number 00001 is his 1966 recording of a Eurasian bittern at Hickling Broad, in Norfolk. The NSA acquired his complete collection of wildlife recordings in the mid-1990s.

In 1968, he was described by the BBC as "the only full-time freelance recordist of wildlife sounds in Britain". He was the subject of a BBC television The World About Us episode, screened on 9 April 1972, and appeared on several other BBC television and radio programmes in the late 1960s and early 1970s.

In the 1970s and 1980s, he was manager of the Minack Theatre, Porthcurno, Cornwall.

The NSA have put most of Shove's recordings online, and as of November 2013 will extend access as part of a Europeana project.

== Discography ==
- The Country Sings (1963)

A series of 7", 33⅓ rpm, EPs of Shove's wildlife recordings, with his narration, were published by Discourses as part of the "Shell Nature" series, in conjunction with Shell-Mex and BP Ltd. Featuring liner notes by Jeffery Boswall, these included:

- Sea Birds (DCL 701, 1966; re-released in 1967 in different packaging)
- Garden And Park Birds (DCL 702, 1966)
- Woodland Birds (DCL 703, 1966)
- Estuary Birds (DCL 704, 1967)
- Field And Open Countryside Birds (DCL 705, 1967)
- Moor And Heath Birds (DCL 706, 1967)
- Marsh And Riverside Birds (DCL 707, 1967)
- Nightingale and Dawn Chorus (DCL 708, 1969)
- Mountain And Highland Birds (DCL 709, 1969)
