= Katharine Burdekin =

British novelist (1896–1963)

- Katharine Burdekin
- Born: Katharine Penelope Cade; 23 July 1896; Spondon, England, United Kingdom of Great Britain and Ireland
- Died: 10 August 1963 (aged 67); Suffolk, England, United Kingdom
- Other names: Murray Constantine; Kay Burdekin
- Education: Cheltenham Ladies' College
- Occupation: writer
- Known for: Feminist science fiction, fantasy, satire
- Spouse: Beaufort Burdekin
- Children: 2
- Relatives: Rowena Cade (sister)

Katharine Penelope Burdekin (née Cade; 23 July 1896 – 10 August 1963) was a British novelist who wrote speculative fiction concerned with social and spiritual matters. She was the younger sister of Rowena Cade, creator of the Minack Theatre in Cornwall. Several of her novels have been described as feminist utopian/dystopian fiction. She also wrote under the name Kay Burdekin and under the pseudonym Murray Constantine. Daphne Patai unraveled "Murray Constantine's" true identity while doing research on utopian and dystopian fiction in the mid-1980s.

== Early life ==
Katharine Penelope Burdekin was born in Spondon, Derbyshire in 1896, the youngest of Charles Cade's four children. Her family had lived in Derby for many years and their ancestors include Joseph Wright of Derby.

She was educated by a governess at their home, The Homestead, and later at Cheltenham Ladies' College. Highly intelligent and an avid reader, she wanted to study at Oxford like her brothers, but her parents did not allow it. She married Olympic rower and barrister Beaufort Burdekin in 1915. They had two daughters, Katharine Jayne (b. 1917) and Helen Eugenie (b. 1920).

Her family moved to Australia, where Katharine started writing. Her first novel, Anna Colquhoun, was published in 1922. Her marriage ended in the same year, and she moved to Minack Head to join her sister. In 1926, she met and formed a lifelong relationship with Isobel Allan-Burns.

== Writing career ==
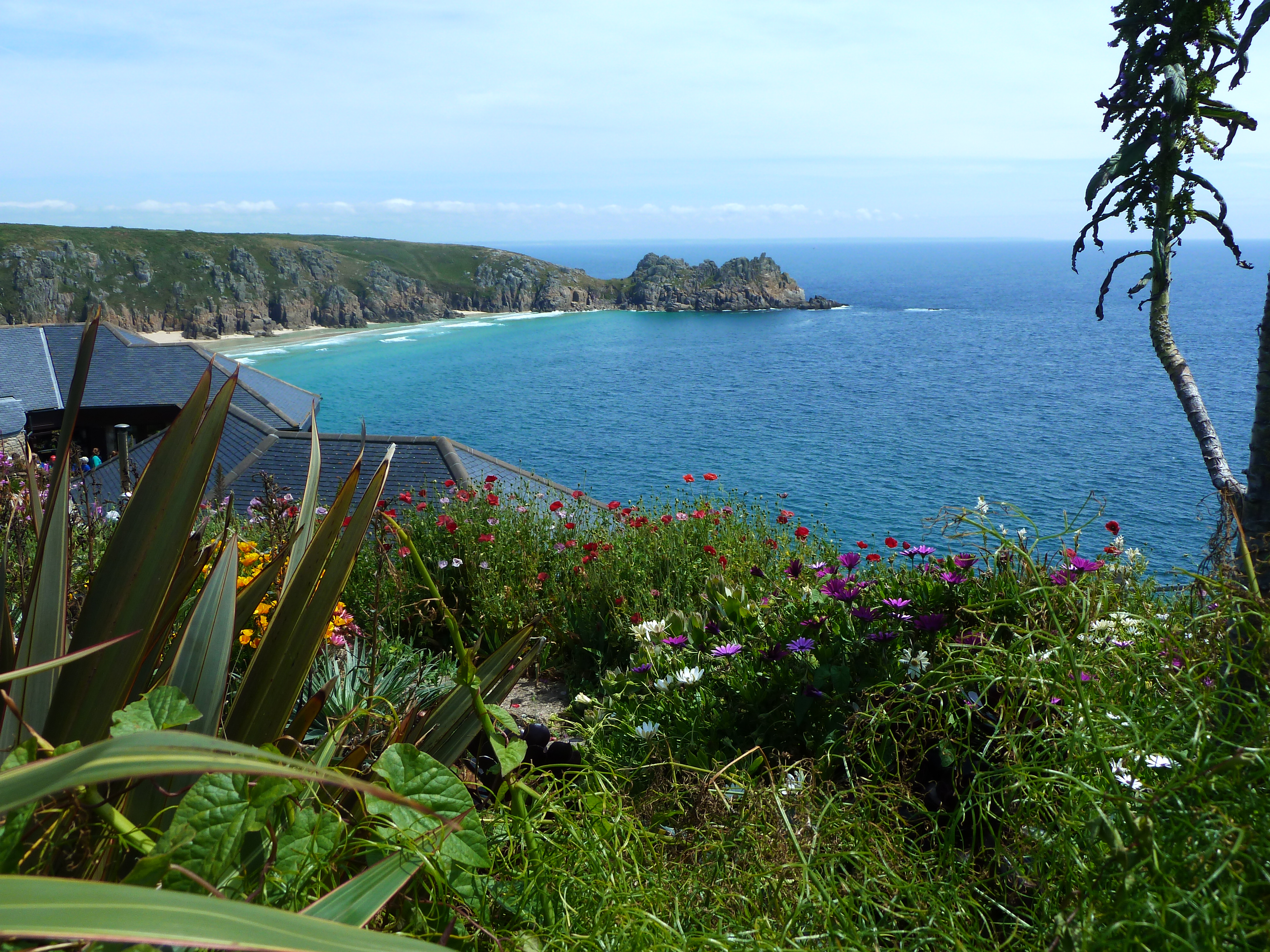
A view near Minack Head where Burdekin lived with her partner, mother, and sister

Burdekin wrote several novels during the 1920s. Of her first novel Anna Colquhoun, the Evening News of Sydney noted that it was "one of the most promising first novels that has come our way for a long time", but she later considered The Rebel Passion (1929) to be her first mature work. The Burning Ring (1927) and The Rebel Passion are both time travel fantasies.

In the 1930s she wrote thirteen novels, six of which were published. Her partner describes how Burdekin's wide-ranging reading would precede a period of quiet for a few days. She would then appear to surrender herself to writing and she would write single mindedly until it was complete. She didn't appear to plan her books, and each book was completed within six weeks.

Burdekin began using the pseudonym Murray Constantine in 1934. She allegedly adopted the pseudonym to protect her family from the risk of repercussions and attacks for her novel's political nature and strong criticism of fascism. Murray Constantine's true identity was unknown until long after Burdekin's death.

In Proud Man (1934) Burdekin uses the arrival of a hermaphrodite visitor from the future to criticise 1930s gender roles. Published the same year, The Devil, Poor Devil! is a satirical fantasy about how the Devil's power is undermined by modern rationalism.

Burdekin published her best-known novel, Swastika Night (1937), as Murray Constantine. Reflecting Burdekin's analysis of the masculine element in fascist ideology, Swastika Night depicts a world divided between two militaristic powers: the Nazis and Japan. Burdekin anticipated the Holocaust and understood the dangers presented by a militarised Japan while most people in her society were still supporting a policy of appeasement. A pacifist committed to communist ideals, Burdekin abandoned pacifism in 1938 out of the conviction that fascism had to be fought.

Burdekin had a period of depression in 1938. Her friend Margaret L. Goldsmith tried to assist by giving her research material on Marie Antoinette. The outcome was a historical novel, Venus in Scorpio, co-authored by Goldsmith and Burdekin (as 'Murray Constantine').

She wrote six further novels after World War II, none of which were published in her lifetime. These novels reflect her feminist commitments that became increasingly spiritual. Her unpublished manuscript, The End of This Day's Business, was published by The Feminist Press in New York in 1989; it is a counterpart to Swastika Night and envisions a distant future in which women rule and men are deprived of all power. This vision was also subjected to Burdekin's critique; she had little patience with what she called "reversals of privilege" and aspired to a future in which domination itself would finally be overcome.

She wrote several children's books, including The Children's Country (titled St John's Eve before it was published in America) about a boy and girl who enter a magical world where children are more powerful than adults.

Burdekin died in 1963. With the growing interest in women's utopian fiction in the last few decades, her work has been the object of considerable scholarly attention. Most early information about her came from Daphne Patai's research. Patai discovered that Burdekin wrote Swastika Night and other feminist speculative fiction in the 1930s that was published under the pseudonym of Murray Constantine. Patai was also involved in their republication.

== Bibliography ==
Title	Year Published	Pseudonym	Notes
Anna Colquhoun	1922		
The Reasonable Hope	1924		
The Burning Ring	1927		
The Children's Country	1929	Kay Burdekin	
The Rebel Passion	1929		
Quiet Ways	1930		
The Devil, Poor Devil	1934	Murray Constantine	
Proud Man	1934	Murray Constantine	Reprinted under her real name in 1993
Swastika Night	1937	Murray Constantine	Reprinted under her real name in 1985
Venus in Scorpio	1940	Murray Constantine	With Margaret Goldsmith
The End of This Day's Business	1989		

== Sources ==
- BookRags
- Dictionary of Literary Biography, Volume 225, British Fantasy and Science-Fiction Writers, 1918–1960 (edited by Darren Harris-Fain, 2002).
