= Minack Theatre =

Open-air theatre in Cornwall, England

- Gwariva Veynek
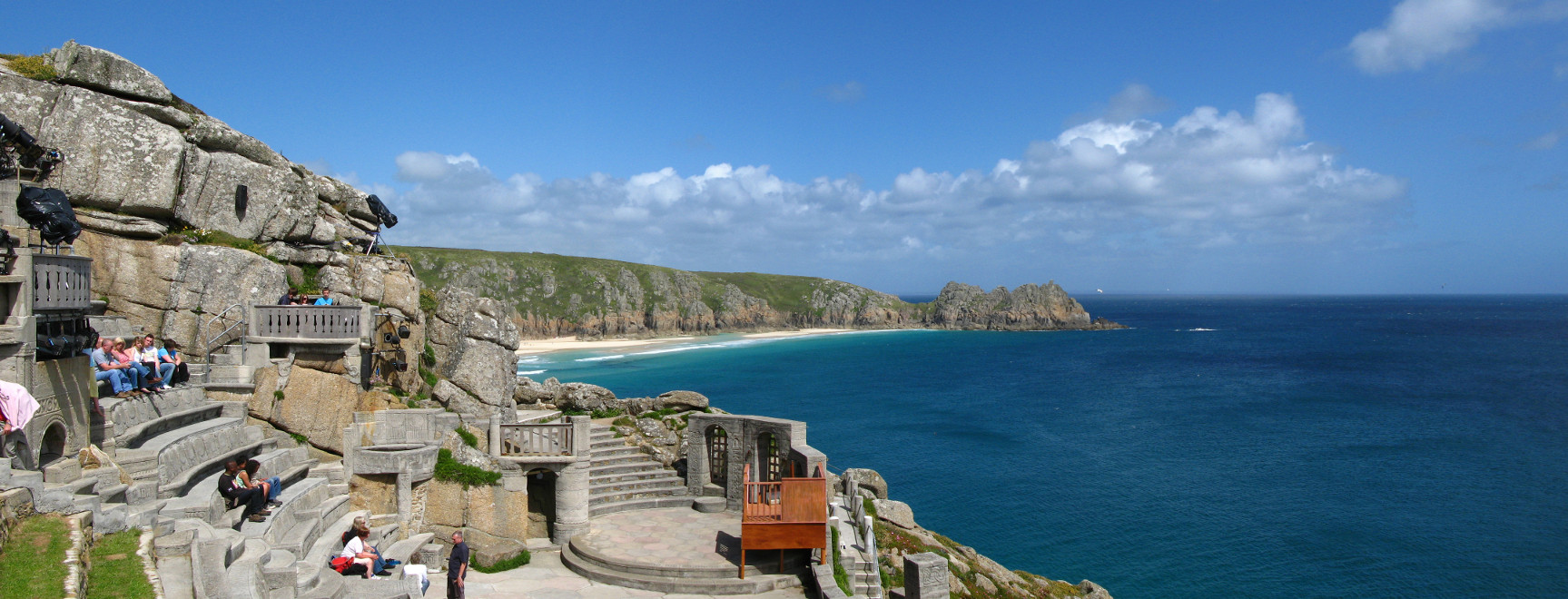
- Interactive map of Minack Theatre
- Address: Porthcurno, Churchtown St., Levan, Penzance, Cornwall, TR19 6JU
- Coordinates: 50.040994°N 5.651275°W

Construction
- Opened: 1932

Website
- https://www.minack.com/

The Minack Theatre (Cornish: Gwariva Veynek, meaning theatre abounding in stones) is an open-air theatre, constructed above a gully with a rocky granite outcrop jutting into the sea. The theatre is at Porthcurno, four miles (six kilometres) from Land's End in Cornwall, England.

The Minack's performing season runs from Easter to the end of October and includes a wide range of music and theatre. Each year, in addition to producing several professional productions itself, the Minack hosts visiting companies. It has appeared in many lists of the world's most spectacular theatres.

== History ==
The theatre was the brainchild of Rowena Cade, who moved to Cornwall after the First World War, bought land at Minack Point for £100, and built a house there for herself and her mother. Her sister was the feminist dystopian author Katharine Burdekin, who lived with them from the 1920s. In 1929, Rowena Cade became involved with a local village group of players who staged Shakespeare's A Midsummer Night's Dream in a nearby meadow at Crean, repeating the production the next year. They decided that their next production would be The Tempest and Miss Cade offered her cliff garden as a suitable location for the play. Miss Cade and her gardener, Billy Rawlings, made a terrace and rough seating, hauling materials down from the house or up via the winding path from the beach below. In 1932, The Tempest was performed with the sea as a dramatic backdrop, to great success. Miss Cade resolved to improve the theatre, working over the course of the winter months each year (with the help of Billy Rawlings, Charles and Thomas Angove and other friends), to create the theatre that exists today. She was still working on it well into her 80s. Rowena Cade died in 1983 shortly before her 90th birthday.

In 1955, the first dressing rooms were built. In the 1970s, the theatre was managed by Lawrence Shove. Since 1976, the theatre has been registered as a charitable trust and is now a Charitable Incorporated Organisation (CIO).

The theatre is open for visitors throughout the year, although visiting days are limited in the winter. The 90th anniversary of the Minack was celebrated with a production of The Tempest performed by Hertfordshire Players in August 2022.

== In popular culture ==
In 1944, the theatre was used as a location for the Gainsborough Studios film Love Story, starring Stewart Granger and Margaret Lockwood, but inclement weather forced them to retreat to a studio mock-up.

== Gallery ==
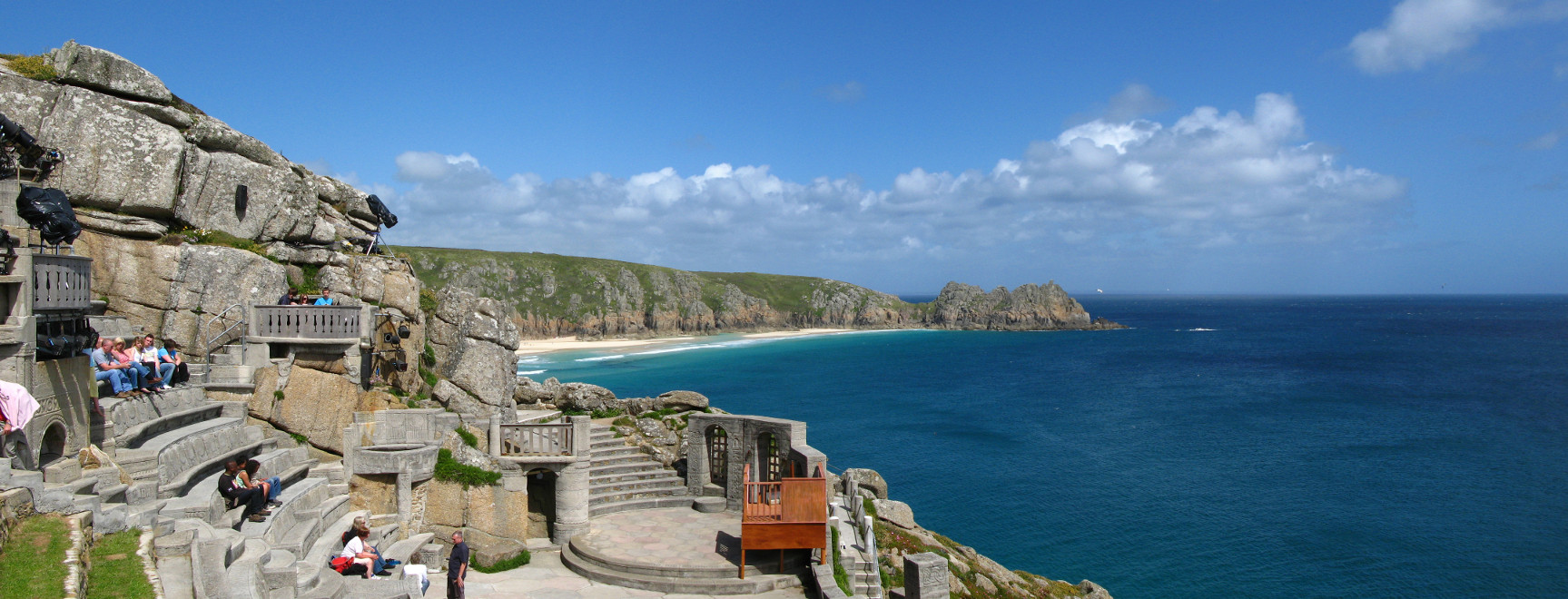
Minack Theatre and view over Porthcurno Bay.

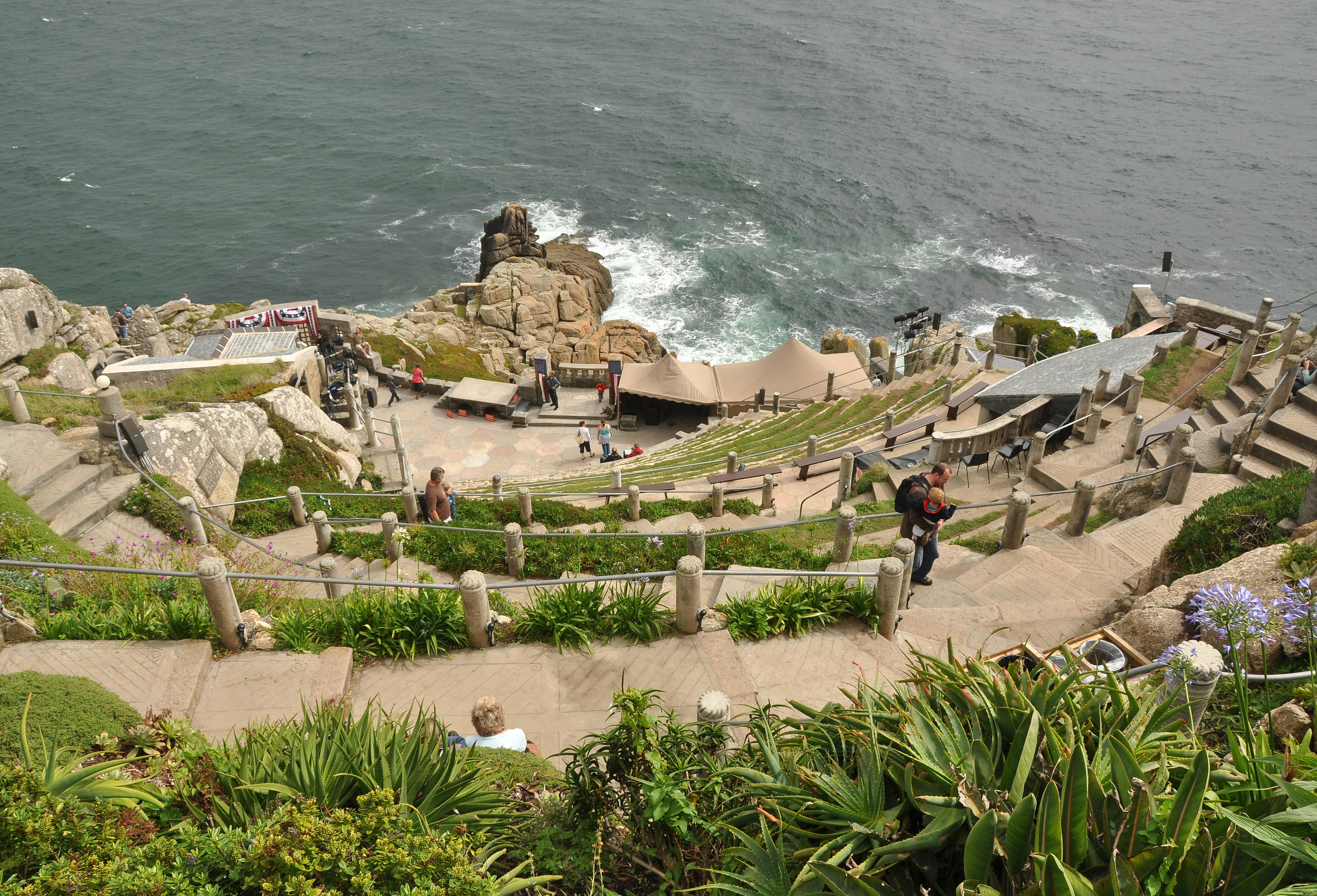
A view highlighting the gradient of the theatre

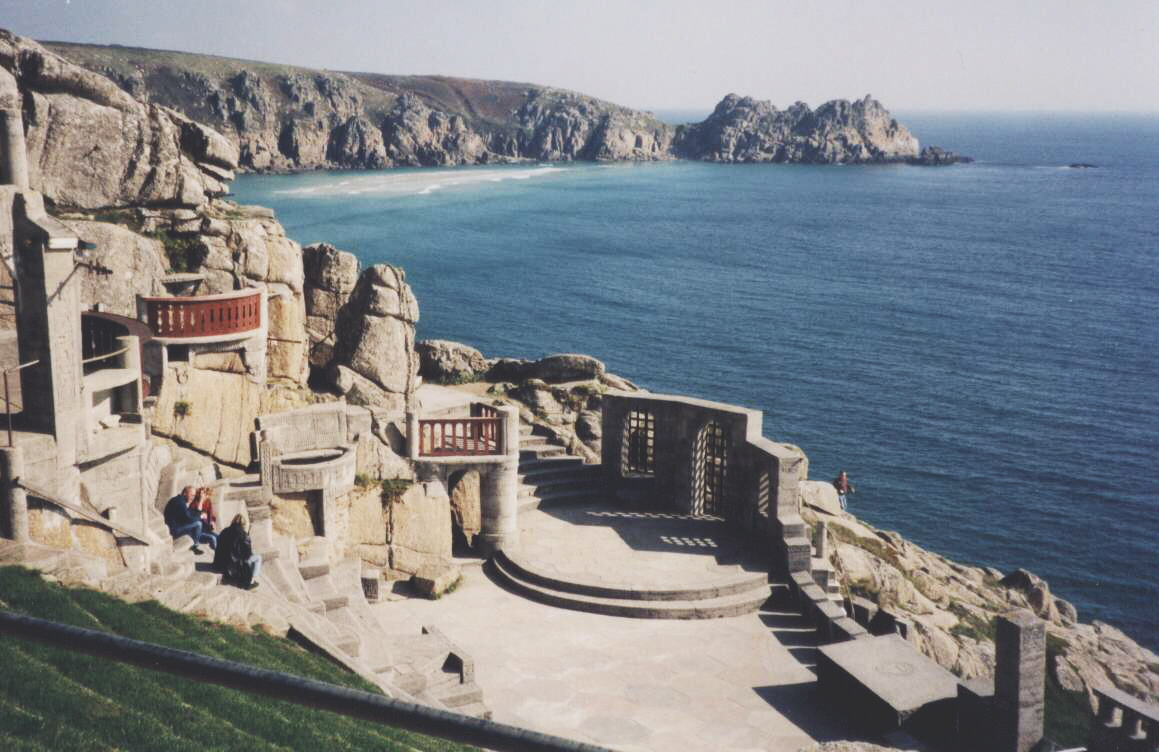
Minack Theatre

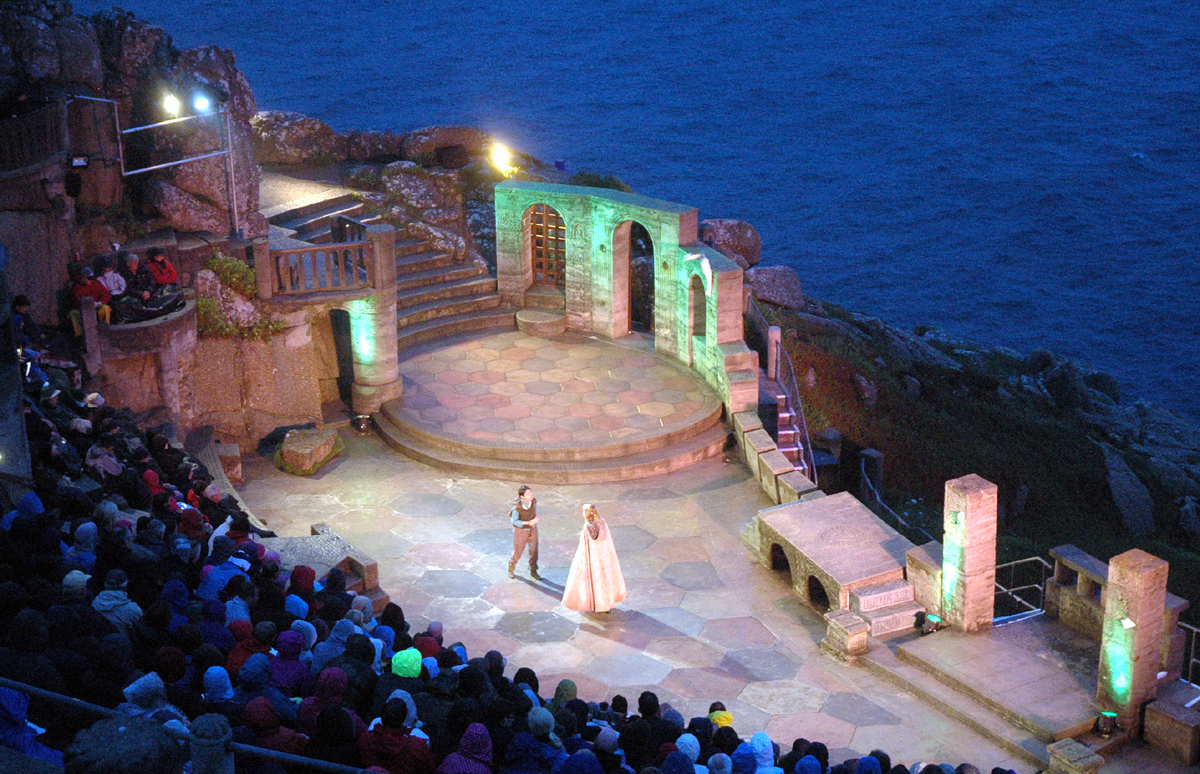
A 2012 Shakespeare production

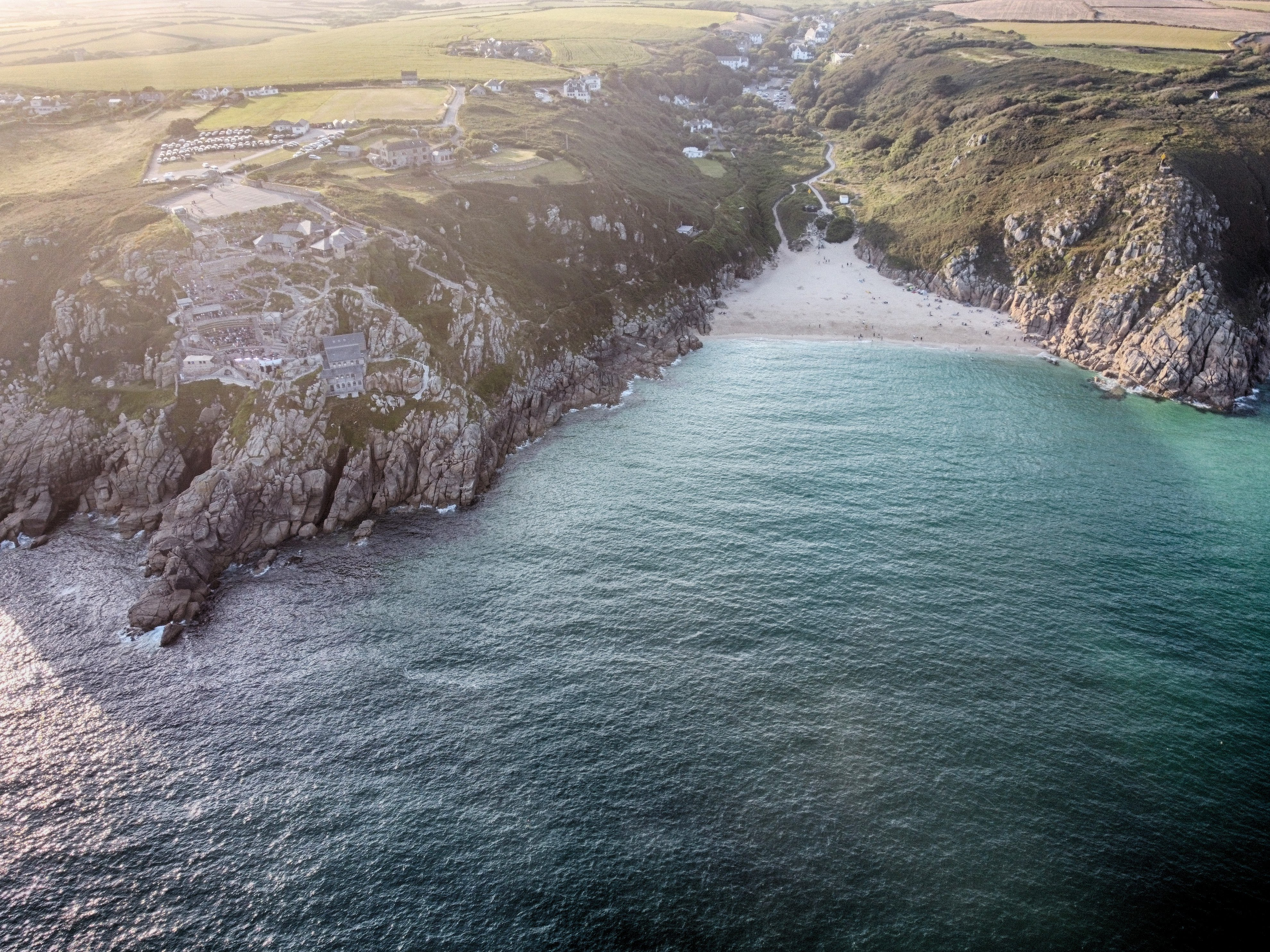
From the air
