= Swastika Night =

1937 novel by Katharine Burdekin

- First edition
- Author: Murray Constantine
- Language: English
- Genre: Dystopian
- Publisher: Victor Gollancz Ltd
- Publication date: 1937
- Publication place: United Kingdom
- Media type: Print (Hardback)
- Pages: 287 pp
- ISBN: 0-935312-56-0
- OCLC: 12162019
- Dewey Decimal: 823/.912 19
- LC Class: PR6003.U45 S8 1985

Swastika Night is a futuristic novel by British writer Katharine Burdekin, writing under the pseudonym Murray Constantine. First published in 1937 and subsequently as a Left Book Club selection in 1940, the novel depicts a world where Adolf Hitler's claim that Nazism would create a "Thousand Year Reich" is realised. Forgotten for many years, until republication in 1985 in England and the United States, literary historian Andy Croft has described Swastika Night as "the most original of all the many anti-fascist dystopias of the late 1930s."

Set hundreds of years in the future, this dystopia envisions a sterile, dying Nazi Reich in which Jews have long since been eradicated, Christians are marginalised, and Hitler is venerated as a God. A "cult of masculinity" prevails, homosexuality has become the norm, and a "reduction of women" has occurred: deprived of all rights, women are kept in concentration camps, their sole value residing in their reproductive roles.

The novel bears striking similarities to Orwell's Nineteen Eighty-Four, published more than a decade later: the past has been destroyed and history is rewritten, language is distorted, few books exist apart from propaganda, and a secret book is the only witness to the past.

== Plot synopsis ==
Swastika Night takes place in a world where Nazi Germany and Imperial Japan defeated their enemies and conquered the world (from a modern perspective, the novel is an alternate history in which the Nazis won World War II, though at the time of its writing the war had not broken out and it was a work of speculative future fiction.) It follows the protagonist Alfred, an Englishman in his 30s who works as a ground mechanic for the German Empire in the Salisbury aerodrome. Alfred comes to Germany on a pilgrimage to see the holy sites of Hitlerism, the religion in this Nazi-dominated world. These sites include the holy forest and the sacred aeroplane in Munich with which Hitler won the Twenty Years' War by personally flying to Moscow, it is said. In this world Hitler is seen as a 7 feet (2.1 m) tall, long blonde-haired, blue-eyed man who was “exploded” from the head of God the Thunderer and was a god in his own right. He is preached about by "Knights" (a cross between the traditional feudal knight and a priest) who pass this job down from father to son.

When Alfred arrives at his Nazi friend Hermann's village, he meets the Knight there, an old man by the name of Friedrich von Hess; Hermann works on this Knight's land. The Knight reveals to Alfred about how history was distorted by a man who even when confronted by the truth proclaimed Hitler a god. The writing of this man's book caused the Nazis to burn everything that contradicted the fact – even the book itself – and also anything that revealed life before the empire or during Hitler's life. An ancestor of von Hess wrote about the truth and entrusted the secret to his descendants as he also obtained and preserved a picture of Hitler and a young blonde woman that Alfred originally mistakes for Hitler. This convinces the already sceptical Alfred that Hitler was not a god when he sees that Hitler was a small, brown-haired man with a paunch.

Alfred then vows to return women to how they should be as in the novel they have become ugly things, with shaved heads and no self-respect, used solely for reproduction and kept in a place called the women's quarters from where they cannot escape and are seen as little more than animals. He also vows that he shall teach what is in his book to his fellow Englishmen and others so that eventually they can cause the shattering of the German Empire as the belief that holds it together falls apart. He presses that it must be an ideological, spiritual rebellion as a violent rebellion would be crushed by the occupation armies of the Germans.

Towards the end of the novel Alfred returns to Britain with the book, where he starts teaching his son from it. A few weeks after finishing the book Alfred, his son and Hermann (who followed Alfred to Britain) are almost caught by Nazi soldiers. While Fred (Alfred's son) escapes with the book, Hermann and Alfred are discovered, whereupon Hermann charges the soldiers and is killed. After this happens the soldiers try to discover the reason behind Hermann and Alfred being there, but are unsuccessful. A soldier then kicks Hermann's corpse, causing Alfred to fly into a rage and get beaten into unconsciousness; the beating is so bad that Alfred wakes up in hospital two days later and gets to talk to Fred one last time about continuing his work just before he dies of his injuries.

== Reception ==
John Clute described Swastika Night as "a scathing feminist anatomy of war, sexism and power" and lists the novel as one of the "classic titles" of inter-war science fiction. Adam Roberts stated "Burdekin's pre-war story reads as horribly prescient and its feminist emphasis ... provides a very valid critique of fascism."

In his monograph Desire and Empathy in Twentieth-Century Dystopian Fiction, Thomas Horan argues that Burdekin introduces sociopolitical enlightenment, ethics, and hope via "queer desire". Swastika Night has been described as a "pioneering feminist critique".

Swastika Night was a Left Book Club selection in 1940—one of the few works of fiction thus honoured.

== Bibliography ==
- Katherine Burdekin: Swastika Night: Old Westbury: Feminist Press: 1985: ISBN 0-935312-56-0

== See also ==
- Hypothetical Axis victory in World War II
- Esoteric Nazism
- Gender in speculative fiction
- Sex and sexuality in speculative fiction
