= Dreyfus =

Dreyfus may refer to:

- Dreyfus (surname)
- Dreyfus affair, a French political scandal
  - Dreyfus (1930 film), a German film on the Dreyfus affair
  - Dreyfus (1931 film), a British film on the Dreyfus affair
- Dreyfus Corporation, a Mellon Financial Corporation subsidiary
- Dreyfus model of skill acquisition
- Disques Dreyfus, a French record label
- The Camille and Henry Dreyfus Foundation, a United States–based charitable foundation
- Dreyfus Prize in the Chemical Sciences, a chemistry award
- 6317 Dreyfus, a main-belt asteroid

== See also ==
- Louis Dreyfus Company, a European trading company
- Dreyfuss
- Dreifuss
