= Derwent Power Station =

Mothballed gas-fired power station

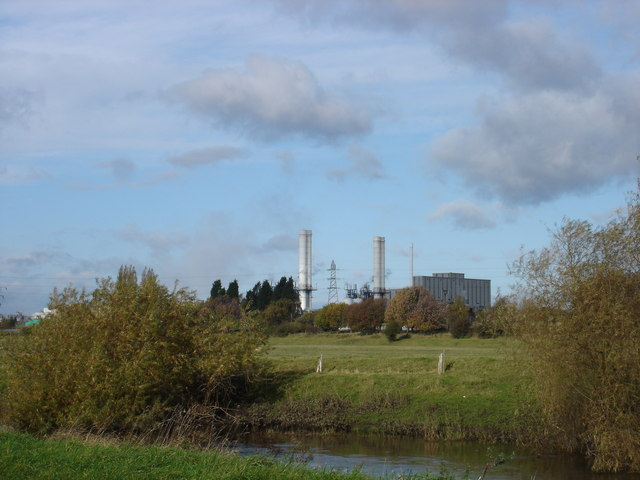
- Derwent Power Station; Viewed from the east in October 2008
- Country: England
- Location: Derbyshire, East Midlands
- Coordinates: 52.9064°N 1.4007°W
- Commission date: 1995
- Decommission date: 2012
- Operator: Scottish and Southern Energy

Thermal power station
- Primary fuel: Natural gas

External links
- Commons: Related media on Commons

Derwent Power Station is a mothballed 214MWe gas-fired power station on Holme Lane near Spondon in Derby, England. It is built on the site of the former Spondon Power Station

== History ==
The current Derwent power station was built on the site of the former Spondon power stations. Spondon A was built in the 1920s by British Celanese. It was sold to the Derbyshire and Nottinghamshire Electric Power Company in 1929. It was then nationalised before eventually being sold to Courtaulds. Spondon A eventually closed in the early 1980s.

In 1959, the Spondon H process steam station opened alongside Spondon A. Spondon H had a capacity of 30 MW using three 10 MW sets, and was unique among the CEGBs power stations as it was designed primarily to produce steam to supply the British Celanese plant after passing through the back-pressure steam turbines. The station had two single-flue concrete chimneys of 96 m (315 ft) in height, one being demolished in the early 1990s the other in the early 2000s. The station also had four concrete cooling towers of 45 m (150 ft) in height located 0.25 miles to the east, these were in practice rarely used. They were demolished in 1984.

The electricity output of the station was as follows.

Spondon electricity output, GWh
Year	Output, GWh
1954	748.709
1955	724.713
1956	652.820
1957	567.757
1958	600.478
1961	517.099
1962	503.861
1963	507.254
1967	562.777
1972	370.268
1979	140.816
1982	66.373

== Derwent power station ==
Derwent power station was originally built for Courtaulds Chemicals and was opened on 1 June 1995 by Tim Eggar, the Energy Secretary. It was owned 17.5% by Courtaulds, 33% by Mission Energy Company (UK) Ltd, and 49.5% by Southern Electric Power Generation (now owned by Scottish and Southern Energy). The nearby works are now owned by Accordis. The 33% stake of Mission Energy was sold to International Power. The other stakes are now owned by Mitsui. Near to the plant is Celanese Acetates Ltd, which used to be British Celanese, which does not have any ownership of the power station. The textiles site was built in 1916 to provide waterproofing for aircraft wings, known as British Cellulose & Chemical Manufacturing and made cellulose acetate and Acetic anhydride. This came from techniques invented by the Swiss chemist, Henri Dreyfus. British Celanese and Courtaulds merged in 1957. Courtaulds was bought by Sara Lee in 2000 following a hostile takeover. The station later traded as Derwent Cogeneration Ltd.

=== Specification ===
Derwent was a combined cycle power station that ran on natural gas. Most of the power was generated for Celanese Acetate site next to the power station. Only around 50MWe is put into the National Grid; and the heat produces steam for the textile plant. This produced electricity for around 180,000 homes; enough for Derby and beyond. It has four General Electric Frame 6 MS6001B gas turbine and a 59MWe steam turbine and surface condenser. It is a combined heat and power (CHP) plant.

=== Closure ===
In 2012, it was announced that the Combined Heat and Power plant (CHP) was to stop supplying steam to the adjacent textile plant due to it closing. The gas station also closed later that year with a loss of around 30 jobs. Since 2012, the station has been retained for future use. In 2018, Peel Environmental purchased the mothballed station in the hope of recommencing power generation at the site. However, these plans did not go ahead, and the station is due to be demolished in 2021 as it is "no longer commercially viable".
