= The Camille and Henry Dreyfus Foundation =

American foundation supporting chemistry research and education

Coordinates: 40.7612°N 73.973°W

- Formation: 1946
- Founder: Camille Dreyfus
- Headquarters: New York, NY, United States
- President: Henry C. Walter
- Revenue: $2,895,924 (2015)
- Expenses: $5,659,652 (2015)
- Website: www.dreyfus.org

The Camille and Henry Dreyfus Foundation is a New York City-based foundation founded in 1946 by chemist and investor Camille Dreyfus in honour of his brother, Henry Dreyfus. The two men invented the acetate yarn Celanese, and Henry Dreyfus was founder and chairman of British Celanese, parent of the Celanese Corporation of America. Following Camille's death in 1956, his wife, the opera singer Jean Tennyson, served as the foundation's president until her death in 1991.

In 1971, the foundation sold a significant part of its holdings in the Celanese company.

The foundation makes grants and awards prizes in support of chemistry research and education. These prizes include the Dreyfus Prize in the Chemical Sciences, Camille Dreyfus Teacher-Scholar Awards, Henry Dreyfus Teacher-Scholar Awards, Machine Learning in the Chemical Sciences and Engineering, Jean Dreyfus Lectureship for Undergraduate Institutions. The foundation also sponsors two awards through the American Chemical Society: the ACS Award for Encouraging Women into Careers in the Chemical Sciences, and the ACS Award for Encouraging Disadvantaged Students into Careers in the Chemical Sciences.

== Dreyfus Prize in the Chemical Sciences ==
The Dreyfus Prize in the Chemical Sciences is an award given to an individual researcher in chemistry. The prize, awarded biennially, consists of a citation, a medal, and a monetary award of $250,000. The prize is awarded by The Camille and Henry Dreyfus Foundation, Inc. to an individual in a selected area of chemistry "to recognize exceptional and original research that has advanced the field in a major way."

== Camille Dreyfus Teacher-Scholar Awards ==
The Camille Dreyfus Teacher-Scholar Awards are awards given to early-career researchers in chemistry "to support the research and teaching careers of talented young faculty in the chemical sciences... who demonstrate leadership in research and education." The Dreyfus Teacher-Scholar program began in 1970. In 1994, the program was divided into two parallel awards: The Camille Dreyfus Teacher-Scholar Awards Program, aimed at research universities, and the Henry Dreyfus Teacher-Scholar Awards Program, directed at primarily undergraduate institutions.

The annually presented awards consist of a monetary prize of $75,000, which was increased to $100,000 starting in 2019. Seven winners of the Camille Dreyfus Teacher-Scholar Awards have gone on to win the Nobel Prize in Chemistry, including Paul L. Modrich, Richard R. Schrock, Robert H. Grubbs, K. Barry Sharpless, Ahmed H. Zewail, Mario J. Molina and Yuan Tseh Lee.

== Henry Dreyfus Teacher-Scholar Awards ==
The Camille Dreyfus Teacher-Scholar Awards are awards given to faculty at primarily undergraduate institutions (PUIs) "to support the research and teaching careers of talented young faculty in the chemical sciences at undergraduate institutions." The annually presented awards consist of a monetary prize of $75,000.

== Machine Learning in the Chemical Sciences and Engineering ==
The Machine Learning in the Chemical Sciences and Engineering Awards are awards "for innovative projects in any area of Machine Learning (ML) consistent with the Foundation’s broad objective to advance the chemical sciences and engineering." They were first awarded in 2020.

== Jean Dreyfus Lectureship for Undergraduate Institutions ==
The Jean Dreyfus Lectureship awards "bring a leading researcher to a primarily undergraduate institution (PUI) to give at least two lectures in the chemical sciences." The annually presented awards consist of a monetary prize of $18,500. Before 2016, this Lectureship was known as the Jean Dreyfus Boissevain Lectureship for Undergraduate Institutions.
