= Dreyfus Prize in the Chemical Sciences =

American chemistry award

The Dreyfus Prize in the Chemical Sciences is an award given to an individual researcher in chemistry. The prize, awarded biennially, consists of a citation, a medal, and a monetary award of $250,000. The prize is awarded by The Camille and Henry Dreyfus Foundation, Inc. to an individual in a selected area of chemistry "to recognize exceptional and original research that has advanced the field in a major way."

The first Dreyfus Prize was awarded in 2009 to George M. Whitesides of Harvard University in the field of materials chemistry, honoring the accomplishments of the Dreyfus brothers, Camille and Henry, who founded Celanese.

Nobel laureates are not eligible. Dreyfus Foundation Advisors and reviewers who serve in the year of the selection are not eligible.

== Recipients ==
Source: Dreyfus Foundation

- 2009 – George M. Whitesides of Harvard University in the chemistry of soft materials.
- 2011 – Tobin J. Marks of Northwestern University in the field of catalysis.
- 2013 – R. Graham Cooks of Purdue University in the field of chemical instrumentation.
- 2015 – Krzysztof Matyjaszewski of Carnegie Mellon University in the field of polymer chemistry.
- 2017 – Michele Parrinello of Università della Svizzera italiana and ETH Zurich in the field of theoretical and computational chemistry.
- 2019 – Robert S. Langer of Massachusetts Institute of Technology in chemistry in support of human health.
- 2021 – James G. Anderson of Harvard University in environmental chemistry.
- 2023 - Xiaowei Zhuang of Harvard University in imaging in the chemical sciences.
- 2025 - Héctor D. Abruña of Cornell University in electrochemical processes.

== See also ==
- List of chemistry awards
