= Derbyshire and Nottinghamshire Electric Power Company =

- Industry: Electricity supply
- Founded: 1901
- Defunct: 31 March 1948
- Fate: Nationalisation
- Successor: British Electricity Authority, East Midlands Electricity Board
- Area served: Derbyshire and Nottinghamshire
- Products: Electricity

The Derbyshire and Nottinghamshire Electric Power Company Limited provided electricity to consumers in the English midland counties of Derbyshire and Nottinghamshire. Electricity was supplied by the company from 1904 until its abolition upon the nationalization of the electricity supply industry in 1948.

== Foundation ==
Derbyshire and Nottinghamshire Electric Power Act 1901
- Act of Parliament
- Parliament of the United Kingdom
- Long title: An Act for incorporating and conferring powers on the Derbyshire and Nottinghamshire Electric Power Company.
- Citation: 1 Edw. 7. c. cxxi

Dates
- Royal assent: 26 July 1901

Other legislation
- Amended by: Derbyshire and Nottinghamshire Electric Power Act 1902

Derbyshire and Nottinghamshire Electric Power Act 1902
- Act of Parliament
- Parliament of the United Kingdom
- Long title: An Act to amend the Derbyshire and Nottinghamshire Electric Power Act 1901.
- Citation: 2 Edw. 7. c. xvii

Dates
- Royal assent: 28 April 1902

Other legislation
- Amends: Derbyshire and Nottinghamshire Electric Power Act 1901

The Derbyshire and Nottinghamshire Electric Power Company Limited was incorporated in 1901. Its legal powers derived from the provisions of the Derbyshire and Nottinghamshire Electric Power Act 1901 (1 Edw. 7. c. cxxi). Its aim was to supply electricity throughout the counties of Derbyshire and Nottinghamshire. The company was one of the pioneering power companies that were founded from around 1900. This new type of enterprise operated at a larger scale at county and regional level, rather than the local authority areas of earlier electricity undertakings. Specifically the 1901 act authorised the company to erect power stations at Colwick near Nottingham; Warsop and Trowell near Ilkeston; and Newbold and Dunston near Chesterfield.

Derbyshire and Nottinghamshire Electric Power Act 1904
- Act of Parliament
- Parliament of the United Kingdom
- Long title: An Act to confer further powers upon the Derbyshire and Nottinghamshire Electric Electric Power Company and for other purposes.
- Citation: 4 Edw. 7. c. lxxvii

Dates
- Royal assent: 22 July 1904

Text of statute as originally enacted

Derbyshire and Nottinghamshire Electric Power Act 1906
- Act of Parliament
- Parliament of the United Kingdom
- Long title: An Act to alter and regulate the capital and borrowing powers of the Derbyshire and Nottinghamshire Electric Power Company and for other purposes.
- Citation: 6 Edw. 7. c. xlvii

Dates
- Royal assent: 4 August 1906

The company obtained further powers under the Derbyshire and Nottinghamshire Electric Power Act 1904 (4 Edw. 7. c. lxxvii). This enabled the company to apply for provisional orders to provide an electricity supply in specified areas. Further powers were granted under the Derbyshire and Nottinghamshire Electric Power Act 1906 (6 Edw. 7. c. xlvii).

== Ilkeston power station ==
The company built a power station at Ilkeston and began supplying electricity in July 1904. By 1915 the plant at Ilkeston comprised: two 500 HP (373 kW) and one 160 HP (119 kW) engines coupled to two generators and one dynamo; one 2.5 MW steam turbine; one 0.7 MW steam alternator; one 1 MW turbo-generator; and two 250 kW converters.

== Acquisition ==
In 1912 the Derbyshire and Nottinghamshire Company's entire share and loan capital was acquired by the Tramway Light and Power Company Limited. This company was founded in 1912 by the engineer George Balfour to acquire the assets and operating rights of electricity undertakings. In addition to the Derbyshire and Nottinghamshire company, it acquired the neighbouring Leicestershire and Warwickshire Electric Power Company, the Midland Electric Light and Power Company, plus several traction or tramway companies. The Tramway Light and Power Company was renamed the Midland Counties Electric Supply Company in 1921, see Midland Electric Light and Power Company Limited.

== Spondon power station ==
In 1922 the Derbyshire and Nottinghamshire Company acquired the Spondon power station from British Celanese. They had built the station in 1917 to supply its own factory. It contained two 6 MW generators with associated boiler plant. These machines were replaced in 1941 with a 30 MW machine and by a further similar set in 1945. By 1950 there were seven generators one 12 MW, one 15 MW, one 25 MW, and four 30 MW machines.These were fed from eight 40,000, eight 80,000 and six 160,000 Ib/hr boilers.

Operating parameters of the company's two stations are summarised in the table.

Ilkeston and Spondon plant 1923
Power station	Ilkeston	Spondon
Consumer voltage	3-phase, 25 Hz, 440 &250 Volt AC 460 & 230 V DC	3-phase, 50 Hz, 6.6 kV, AC
Boiler plant lb/hr	85,500	210,000
Generators	1 × 0.75 MW AC 1 × 0.75 MW AC 1× 1.0 MW AC 1 × 2.5 MW AC 1 × 0.1 MW DC 1 × 0.3 MW DC [Total 5 MW]	2 × 6 MW [Total 12 MW]
Maximum load MW	3,189	Included in Ilkeston
Number of connections	13,765	Included in Ilkeston
Electricity sold MWh	7,708	Included in Ilkeston

Derbyshire and Nottinghamshire Electric Power Act 1929
- Act of Parliament
- Parliament of the United Kingdom
- Long title: An Act to authorise the Derbyshire and Nottinghamshire Electric Power Company to raise additional capital to confer further powers upon the Company and for other purposes.
- Citation: 19 & 20 Geo. 5. c. lxxxvi

Dates
- Royal assent: 10 May 1929

Text of statute as originally enacted

The Ilkeston station was decommissioned in the late 1920s. The company obtained further powers under the Derbyshire and Nottinghamshire Electric Power Act 1929 (19 & 20 Geo. 5. c. lxxxvi). This increased the monies that the company may use on the operation and construction of new plant.

The National Grid was constructed from 1927. A 132 kV circuit provided an export route from Spondon to the wider region. The circuit comprised Hams Hill, Coventry, Leicester, Nottingham, Burton-on-Trent and Spondon.

By 1937 the Derbyshire and Nottinghamshire company was operating as a power company, by generating, or otherwise acquiring, electric current for local undertakings. The extent of the electricity generation and supply is shown in the following tables.

Spondon power station operations 1937
Parameter	Value
Consumer voltage	3-phase, 50 Hz, 11 & 6.6 kV, 460 &230 Volt AC 460 & 230 V DC 11,000 V AC Traction
Boiler plant lb/hr	1,170, 000
Generators	2 × 6.0 MW AC 1 × 12.0 MW AC 1× 15.0 MW AC 1 × 25.0 MW AC 2 × 30.0 MW AC [Total 124 MW]
Maximum load MW	90,200
Number of connections	206,861
Number of consumers	58,332
Electricity sold MWh	325,623

The electricity undertakings supplied by the Derbyshire and Nottinghamshire Company in 1937 are shown on the table.

Undertakings supplied by the Derbyshire and Nottinghamshire Company 1937
Authorized undertaker	Sales MWh	Sales £
Ashbourne	53	716
Bakewell	1,866	18,079
Beeston	2,994	37,256
Belper	694	9,307
East Notts	4,347	41,489
Hartington Upper Quarter & Kingsterndale	1,892	7,199
Heanor	2,484	33,018
Ilkeston	1,810	21,439
Matlock	1,387	16,350
Misterton	142	1,522
North Derbyshire	843	10,156
Shardlow	803	9,572
Sutton-in-Ashfield	3,092	40,855
West Derbyshire	1,114	13,023
Power Undertaker	302,112	603,423
Total	325,633	863,371

Spondon power station operations in the final years of the Derbyshire and Nottinghamshire Power Company are as shown in the table.

Spondon power station operations 1946-48
Year	1946	1947	1948
Maximum load MW	166.3	164.3	161
Electricity supplied MWh	879,734	859,584	787,027
Running hours			8,784

== Abolition ==
The Derbyshire and Nottinghamshire Electric Power Company Limited was abolished on 31 March 1948 under the provisions of the Electricity Act 1947 which nationalized the British electricity supply industry. The generating plant was vested in the British Electricity Authority and the distribution infrastructure in the East Midlands Electricity Board.

Generation of electricity at Spondon power station continued until it closed on 1 October 1982. For further details see Derwent Power Station.

== See also ==
- Timeline of the UK electricity supply industry
- List of pre-nationalisation UK electric power companies
- Leicestershire and Warwickshire Electric Power Company
- Bedfordshire, Cambridgeshire and Huntingdonshire Electricity Company
