= Jean Tennyson =

American soprano, theatre and radio actress, and philanthropist (1905–1991)

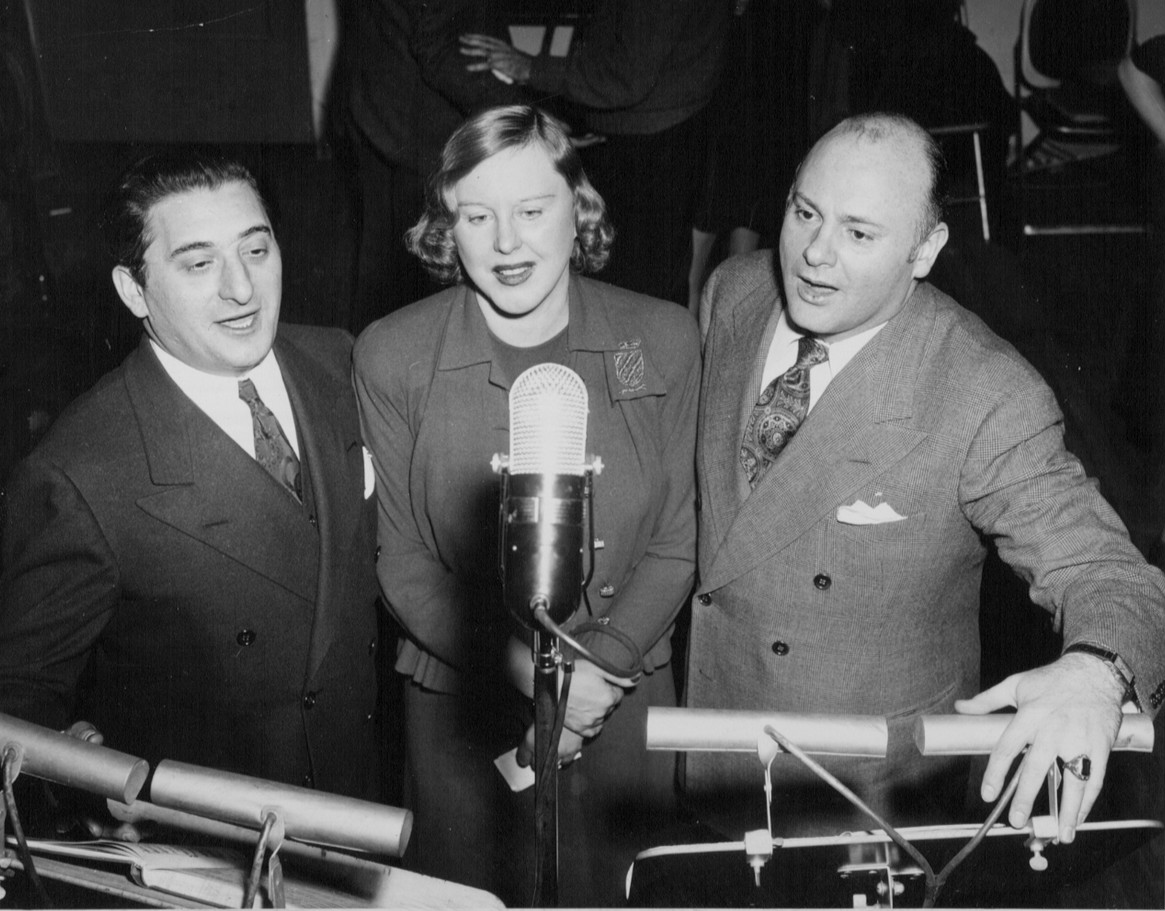
Tennyson performing with Jan Peerce (left) and Robert Weede (right) on the CBS Radio program Great Moments in Music on October 13, 1942

Jean Tennyson (15 September 1898 (Note: While Tennyson's 1991 obituary in The New York Times reported she was 86 at the time of her death, this is most likely not accurate due to biographical content from publications during her early career. A 1919 article reporting on her stage debut in Variety stated she had been working for some time as a bookkeeper for Armour and Company and had reported that she had sung a recital a couple years earlier. It's clear that she was a young adult with a few years as an adult in the workforce at the time of this 1919 publication, which means she could not have been born in 1905 and was not 14 years old at the time of her debut in 1919 and must have been older than 86 at the time of her death. Her gravestone gives her date of birth as 1903, but both her birth certificate issued March 31, 1924, and her passport issued on May 10, 1924, listed her birth date as September 15, 1898 (apparently the birth certificate was issued belatedly in order to obtain the passport).) – 16 March 1991), also known by her married names Jean Tennyson Dreyfus and Jean Tennyson Boissevain, was an American soprano, musical theatre actress, philanthropist, and radio personality. She began her career performing in musicals and cabaret shows in Chicago; making her stage debut in 1919. She made her Broadway debut in the chorus of Albert Von Tilzer's 1923 musical Adrienne; ultimately taking over the title role four months into the shows run and performing that part on tour in 1924. After starring in the Broadway musical revue The Earl Carroll Vanities in 1928 and 1929, her career shifted towards opera and work as a concert soprano. She was a leading soprano in operas and concerts internationally from the 1930s through the 1940s, performing on the stages of opera houses like La Scala, La Fenice, the Vienna Volksoper, the Chicago Civic Opera and the San Francisco Opera.

Tennyson's first marriage was to the Swiss chemist and founder of American Celanese Corporation Camille Dreyfus, whose company sponsored the 1940s CBS Radio program The Celanese Hour, better known as Great Moments in Music; a weekly program hosted by Tennyson from 1942 to 1946 which featured her interviewing and performing with notable musicians of the period. Following Dreyfus's death in 1956, Tennyson became the president of The Camille and Henry Dreyfus Foundation through which she oversaw numerous philanthropic causes in the sciences. She also used her significant fortune to support arts organizations internationally, including the New York Philharmonic and the Maggio Musicale Fiorentino, and aid in the artistic training and careers of young musicians. She was the recipient of the Order of the Star of Italian Solidarity and the St. Olav's Medal by the King of Norway. Her second marriage was to Ernest William Boissevain (1898–1984).

== Early life and musical theatre career ==
Jean Tennyson Solberg was born in Chicago on 15 September 1898. Her father was a Norwegian-born musician and her mother was an American of German descent. She worked as a bookkeeper in her native city for Armour and Company prior to her career as a singer and actress. She studied singing with Mary Garden in Chicago and later in New York City with famous pedagogue Estelle Liebling.

Tennyson began her career as a musical theatre actress, making her stage debut at the Cort Theater in Chicago using the stage name Jean Tennyson in the Edwardian musical comedy The Better 'Ole in 1919; a production produced by Charles Coburn and his wife. In 1920, she starred in the cabaret revue "Fads and Fashions" at the Palais Royale Ballroom in South Bend, Indiana, and appeared in comedienne and vaudeville star Jimmy Hussey's revue Tattle Tales at the Globe Theatre in Boston. In 1921, she worked as a cabaret singer at the Café Beaux-Arts in Philadelphia and the Venetian Gardens in Montreal.

Tennyson made her Broadway debut at George M. Cohan's Theatre as a chorus girl in Albert Von Tilzer's 1923 musical Adrienne; and later took over the lead title role of Adrienne Grey four months into the shows run in August 1923. In 1924, she toured the North Eastern part of the United States in that role; appearing at the Tremont Theatre, Boston, and the Montauk Theatre in Brooklyn among other theaters. She spent the next two years studying opera in Italy. In 1928, she was cast as a lead singer in the Broadway musical revue The Earl Carroll Vanities; a production she remained with through the end of 1929. In that production she shared the stage with W. C. Fields, Joe Frisco, and Martha Morton.

== Career in opera and as a concert soprano ==
Tennyson was primarily active as an opera singer in major European opera houses during the 1930s; including performances at La Scala and La Fenice in Italy. She toured with Fortune Gallo's San Carlo Opera Company in the early 1930s in the roles of Nedda in Pagliacci, Leonora in Il trovatore, Gilda in Rigoletto, and Marguerite in Charles Gounod's Faust. In 1933, she starred in Franz Lehár's operetta The Land of Smiles with tenor Charles Hackett in a production mounted by The Shubert Organization for performances in their chain of theaters.

In 1934, Tennyson made her debut at the Chicago Civic Opera House as Mimì in Giacomo Puccini's La bohème. She remained with that company the following season, where her other roles included Nedda (1935) and Marguerite (1935). She gave her first recital in Chicago in 1935 at the Auditorium Building; an event whose purpose was to raise money for the Saint Mary of Nazareth Hospital in Northwest Chicago. In 1936, she sang Mimì again for her debut at the Vienna Volksoper. In 1938, she returned to Chicago to give a recital at the Petrillo Music Shell in Grant Park with Glenn Cliffe Bainum and his band, and was once again performing with the Chicago Civic Opera, this time in the title role of Puccini's Tosca and Micaela in Bizet's Carmen. In 1941, she performed the role of Nedda in Pagliacci at the Trenton War Memorial. In 1942, she portrayed Fiora in Italo Montemezzi's L'amore dei tre re at the San Francisco Opera. That same year she toured the United States performing with the Charles L. Wagner Opera Company.

On the concert stage, Tennyson performed a concert of music by Bernhard Paumgartner for soprano and orchestra with the Vienna Philharmonic under the composer's baton at the Salzburg Festival in 1935. In 1938, she sang Puccini's Mimì for a concert version of La bohème at the Hollywood Bowl with the Los Angeles Philharmonic. In 1939, she performed a concert of arias for Prince Olav V of Norway and Princess Märtha of Sweden at a special dinner held for them at The Palmer House in Chicago. In 1941, she was the guest soprano soloist in a series of six concerts presented by the National Symphony Orchestra in honor of Ignacy Jan Paderewski under conductor Charles O'Connell. In 1943, she performed a concert of excerpts from operettas with tenor Jan Peerce and the New York Philharmonic under conductor Robert Stolz; including music form The Merry Widow, The Chocolate Soldier, and The Gypsy Baron among other works.

== Philanthropy and charitable work ==
During World War II, Tennyson volunteered her time at the Stage Door Canteen; performing for active American and Allied servicemen. After the war, she served as the president of the Artists' Hospital Program; a charity founded by Marjorie Lawrence which partnered with the United States Department of Veterans Affairs to have performers visit veterans hospitals to perform for wounded and sick veterans. Following the death of her first husband, chemist Camille Dreyfus in 1956, she served as the President of The Camille and Henry Dreyfus Foundation; and used that philanthropic role to support scientific education and research.

Tennyson was also involved in several philanthropic ventures related to classical music, including being a major donor to the New York Philharmonic through the Philharmonic Society of New York and serving as Vice President of the Lewisohn Stadium Concerts. She was also chairman of the American Friends of the Florence Music Festival, a philanthropic organization that raised money for the May Festival of the Maggio Musicale Fiorentino. For this work she was awarded the Order of the Star of Italian Solidarity by the government of Italy in 1952. She was also the recipient of the St. Olav's Medal by the King of Norway. She was a board member of and major donor to the New York City Opera, and purchased box seats which she gave to voice students who could not afford to purchase seats for themselves.

Tennyson's philanthropy was also targeted at supporting the training and careers of young American artists. She was instrumental in bringing a young Mario Lanza to the attention of the public, by affording him one of his earliest public performance opportunities on the CBS Radio program Great Moments in Music; a radio series hosted by Tennyson which was sponsored by her first husband's chemical company. Tennyson began hosting the weekly program in January 1942. She was also a regular performer on this radio program. She also established a foundation which provided money for the training of young singers. In one example, a young Beverly Sills was once awarded $20,000.00 by her foundation to provide Sills with the opportunity to the study the French language repertoire with Mary Garden. Garden and Tennyson were lifelong friends, and Garden dedicated her autobiography "To Jean Tennyson in loving appreciation of our long and loyal friendship."

== Personal life and death ==
Tennyson was married to chemist Camille Dreyfus on September 18, 1931, by Rabbi Jonah B. Wise at his home at 35 E. 62 St., New York City (he was a leading reform rabbi and founder of the United Jewish Appeal) They remained married until the death of Camille Dreyfus on September 27, 1956.

She later married Ernest William Boissevain at the home of Mrs. George Hamlin Shaw in New York City on May 22, 1958. Boissevain died on April 13, 1984, and Jean died on March 16, 1991, both at their home in La Tour-de-Peilz, Switzerland. They are buried together in the Meeting House Cemetery in Brattleboro, Vermont. Jean had no children from either marriage; Ernest had been married three times (once widowed, twice divorced) before he married Jean, and also had no children.

== Notes and references ==
References
