= Tattletale =

A tattletale is someone who reports others' wrongdoings.

Tattletale, or variant, may also refer to:

- Tattle Tale, an American folk punk rock group
- Tattle Tales, a 1920 musical and comedy revue with Jimmy Hussey
- Tattle Tales, a 1933 Broadway musical and comedy revue produced by Frank Fay
- Tattletale, an alias of the Marvel comics character Franklin Richards
- TattleTales (album), a 2020 album by 6ix9ine
- Tattletale, another name for tell-tale, suspended chains to warn drivers of a low clearance bridge ahead
- Tattletales, an American TV game show hosted by Bert Convy
- tattletale, a Java code analysis tool in the JBoss/Wildfly toolchain

== See also ==
- Tattletail, a survival horror video game
- Tattler (disambiguation)
- Tatler (disambiguation)
- Informant
