= Tatul (disambiguation) =

Tatul may refer to:

== Places ==
- Tatul (Татул), a village in Momchilgrad municipality, Kardzhali Province, in the Eastern Rhodopes, in southern Bulgaria.
- Tatul Island, a triangular ice-free island off the north coast of Robert Island in the South Shetland Islands, Antarctica
- Tatul, Armenia (Թաթուլ), a village in the Aragatsotn Province of Armenia

== People ==
Tatul

- Tatul Altunyan (1901-1973), Armenian conductor, founder of Armenian State Song-Dance Ensemble (currently named after him), People's Artist of USSR
- Tatul Avoyan (born 1964), known commonly by his mononymn Tatul or Tatoul, an Armenian rabiz singer
- Tatul Hakobyan (born 1969), Armenian reporter and political analyst

Tatoul

- Tatoul of Marash, Armenian ruler of Marash until 1104
- Tatoul Markarian (born 1964), Armenian diplomat

== See also ==
- Tatl
- Tatle (disambiguation)
- Tattle
