= Krzysztof Matyjaszewski =

Polish-American polymer chemist (born 1950)

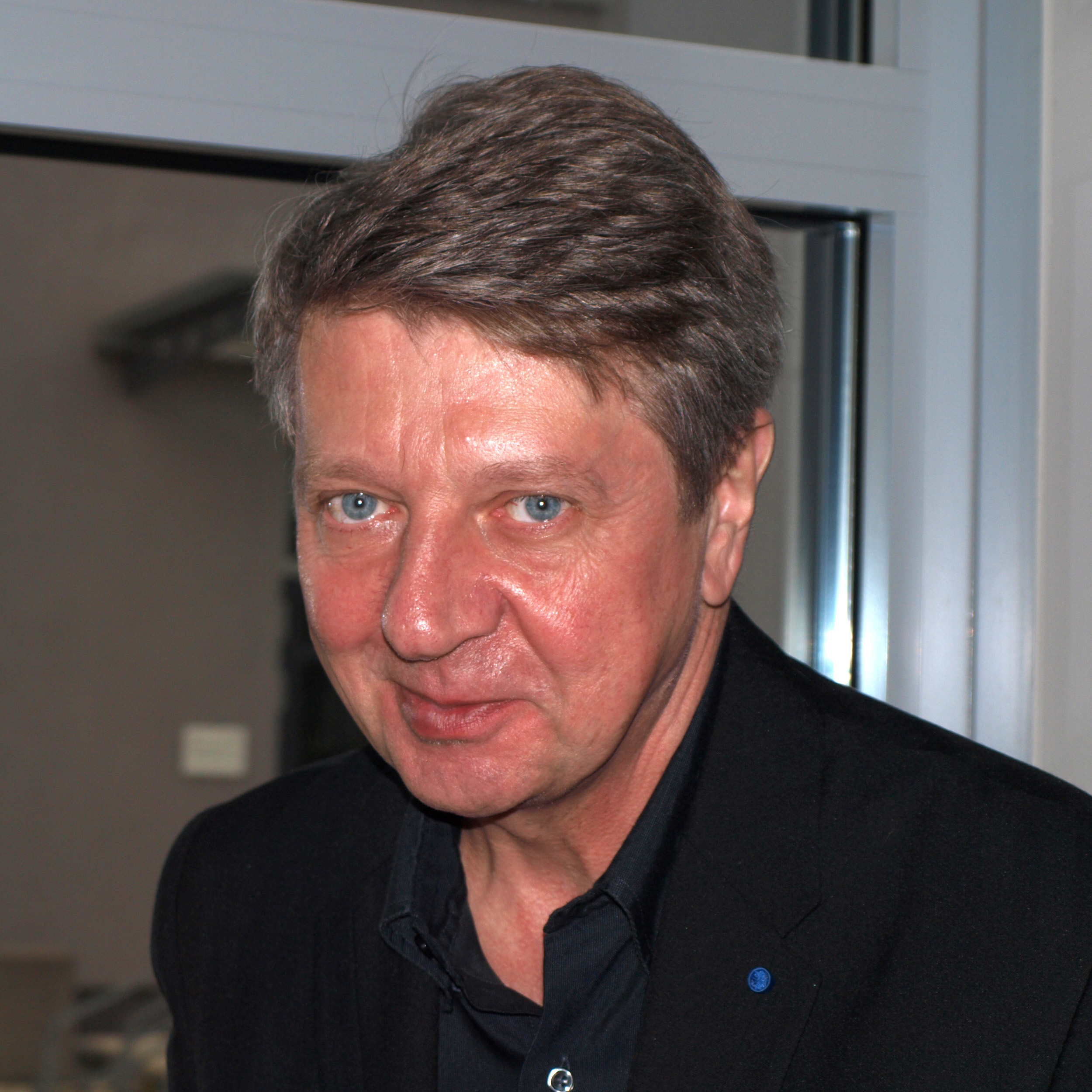
- Born: April 8, 1950 (age 76); Konstantynów Łódzki, Poland
- Citizenship: Poland, United States
- Education: Lodz University of Technology
- Known for: Atom transfer radical polymerization
- Awards: ACS Gabor A. Somorjai Award for Creative Research in Catalysis (2027); Blaise Pascal Medal (2026); NAS Award in Chemical Sciences (2023); Grand Prix de la Fondation de la Maison de la Chimie (2020); Franklin Institute Award (2017); Dreyfus Prize in the Chemical Sciences (2015); Wolf Prize in Chemistry (2011); Presidential Green Chemistry Challenge Award (2009); Prize of the Foundation for Polish Science (2004)
- Scientific career
- Fields: Chemistry; Polymer chemistry
- Workplaces: Carnegie Mellon University
- Doctoral students: Kathryn Beers

Krzysztof "Kris" Matyjaszewski (Polish: [ˈkʂɨʂtɔf matɨjaˈʂɛfskʲi]; born April 8, 1950) is a Polish-American chemist. He is the J.C. Warner Professor of the Natural Sciences at the Carnegie Mellon University Matyjaszewski is best known for the discovery of atom transfer radical polymerization (ATRP), a novel method of polymer synthesis that has revolutionized the way macromolecules are made.

Matyjaszewski was elected a member of the National Academy of Engineering in 2006 and the National Academy of Sciences in 2019 for expanding the capabilities of controlled/living polymerizations and developing ATRP, a robust catalytic process for the radical polymerization of monomers. He received the prestigious Wolf Prize in Chemistry in 2011, the Dreyfus Prize in the Chemical Sciences in 2015, and the Grand Prix de la Fondation de la Maison de la Chimie, France in 2020, the National Academy of Sciences Award in Chemical Sciences in 2023 the Blaise Pascal Medal in Chemistry from the European Academy of Sciences in 2026 and the Gabor A. Somorjai Award for Creative Catalysis from the American Chemical Society in 2027.

== Education and career ==
Matyjaszewski began studying chemistry at Lodz University of Technology in late 1960s and later graduated from the Petrochemical University in Moscow. He received his doctorate from the Center of Molecular and Macromolecular Studies of the Polish Academy of Sciences in 1976 and completed a postdoctoral fellowship at the University of Florida in 1977. From 1978 to 1984, he was a research associate of the Polish Academy of Sciences. From 1984 to 1985, Matyjaszewski held appointments at the University of Paris, first as a research associate and then as a visiting professor. In 1985, he joined the chemistry department at Carnegie Mellon University. He founded and currently directs the university's Center for Macromolecular Engineering. This center is funded both by an active consortium and government agencies, including the National Science Foundation. In 1998, Matyjaszewski was appointed the J.C. Warner Professor of Natural Sciences. In 2004 he was named a university professor, the highest distinction faculty can achieve at Carnegie Mellon. Matyjaszewski is also an adjunct professor in Carnegie Mellon's department of materials science and chemical engineering.

From 1994 to 1998, Matyjaszewski served as head of the department of chemistry at Carnegie Mellon and assisted in recruiting additional faculty with strengths in polymer chemistry. At the same time, he formed a research consortium with various industrial corporations to expand the understanding of controlled radical polymerization, including ATRP, and accelerate the transfer of this technology to different commercial applications. A second consortium, the CRP Consortium, formed under his leadership in 2001, continues and expands these efforts, training university and industrial scientists in procedures for responsive polymeric material development and has comprised 60 industrial members. The same year, Matyjaszewski became an adjunct professor at Polish Academy of Sciences and at the Department of Chemical and Petroleum Engineering of the University of Pittsburgh.

Matyjaszewski is a co-inventor on 72 issued U.S. patented technologies and holds over 150 international patents.

One of the leading educators in the field of polymer chemistry, Matyjaszewski has mentored more than 300 undergraduate, graduate and postdoctoral students since joining Carnegie Mellon. He has co-authored 25 books, 100 book chapters and more than 1,380 peer-reviewed scientific papers. According to Google Scholar, his work has been cited in the scientific literature more than 219,000 times, with an h-index of 221, making him one of the most cited chemists in the world.

Matyjaszewski has received numerous awards for his work, including the 2023 National Academy of Sciences Award in Chemical Sciences, 2020 Grand Prix de la Fondation de la Maison de la Chimie, France, 2017 Benjamin Franklin Medal in Chemistry, 2017 Medema Lecture Award, 2015 Dreyfus Prize in the Chemical Sciences, 2014 National Institute of Materials Science (Japan) Award, 2012 Dannie Heineman Prize from the Göttingen Academy of Sciences, 2011 Wolf Prize in Chemistry and the 2009 Presidential Green Chemistry Challenge Award. He has been honored by the American Chemical Society (ACS) with the 2002 Polymer Chemistry Award, 2011 Applied Polymer Science Award, 2011 Herman Mark Award, 2015 Charles G. Overberger Prize, 2019 Chemistry of Materials Award, 2020 Paul Flory Polymer Education Award, 2020 Nichols Medal and the 2026 Blaise Pascal Medal in Chemistry from the European Academy of Sciences. He is a member of the U.S. National Academy of Engineering, National Academy of Sciences and National Academy of Inventors, as well as a member of the Polish, Australian and European Academies of Sciences. He also is an honorary member of the Israeli and Chinese Chemical Societies.

Matyjaszewski's work has been recognized in his native country of Poland. In 2004, he received the annual Prize of the Foundation for Polish Science, the most prestigious scientific award in Poland, referred to as the Polish Nobel Prize. In 2005 he became a foreign member of the Polish Academy of Sciences. He received honorary degrees from Polish universities Lodz University of Technology in 2007, Poznań University in 2016, Rzeszow University of Technology in 2024 and Jan Dlugosz University in 2026. He has also received honorary degrees from the Technion, Israel, the University of Ghent, Belgium, Russian Academy of Sciences, University of Athens, Greece, Polytechnic Institute in Toulouse, France, Pusan National University in South Korea., Universite P. & M. Curie, Sorbonne in Paris, University of Padua, Italy, University of Coimbra, Portugal and University of Crete, Greece.

== Awards and honors ==
- 1974 Award of the Scientific Secretary of the Polish Academy of Sciences
- 1980 Award of the Polish Chemical Society
- 1981 Award of the Polish Academy of Sciences
- 1989 Presidential Young Investigator Award, National Science Foundation
- 1995 Carl S. Marvel Creative Polymer Chemistry Award, American Chemical Society
- 1998 Elf Chair of the French Academy of Sciences
- 1999 Humboldt Prize for Senior Scientists
- 2001 Fellow, Polymeric Materials Science and Engineering Fellow, American Chemical Society
- 2001 Pittsburgh Award, American Chemical Society
- 2002 Polymer Chemistry Award, American Chemical Society
- 2004 Cooperative Research Award, American Chemical Society
- 2004 Prize of the Foundation for Polish Science
- 2005 Chair, Gordon Research Conference, Polymer East
- 2005 Foreign Member, Polish Academy of Sciences
- 2005 Macro Group Medal, Royal Society of Chemistry
- 2006 Member, National Academy of Engineering
- 2007 Herman Mark Senior Scholar Award, American Chemical Society
- 2008 Clarivate Citation Laureate
- 2009 Presidential Green Chemistry Challenge Award
- 2010 Fellow, American Chemical Society Polymer Chemistry Division
- 2010 Gutenberg Award, University of Mainz
- 2011 Fellow, American Chemical Society
- 2011 Applied Polymer Science Award, American Chemical Society
- 2011 Japanese Society Polymer Science Award
- 2011 Wolf Prize in Chemistry, with Stuart Alan Rice of the University of Chicago and Ching W. Tang of the University of Rochester
- 2012 Dannie-Heineman Prize, Göttingen Academy of Sciences
- 2012 Société Chimique de France Prize
- 2012 Marie Curie Medal, Polish Chemical Society
- 2013 Madison Marshall Award, American Chemical Society, Alabama Section
- 2013 Inaugural Akzo Nobel North America Science Award, American Chemical Society
- 2014 Fellow, National Academy of Inventors
- 2014 National Institute for Materials Science (Japan) Award
- 2015 The Charles Overberger Prize (ACS)
- 2015 The Dreyfus Prize in the Chemical Sciences
- 2017 Franklin Institute Award in Chemistry
- 2019 Member, National Academy of Sciences
- 2019 Corresponding member, Australian Academy of Science
- 2019 Chemistry of Materials Award, American Chemical Society
- 2020 Fellow, European Academy of Sciences
- 2020 Paul Flory Polymer Education Award, American Chemical Society
- 2020 William H. Nichols Medal, ACS New York Section
- 2020 Grand Prix de la Fondation de la Maison de la Chimie
- 2022 CNRS Ambassador of Chemical Sciences in France
- 2023 National Academy of Sciences Award in Chemical Sciences
- 2026 Blaise Pascal Medal in Chemistry from the European Academy of Sciences
- 2027 ACS Gabor A. Somorjai Award for Creative Research in Catalysis

== Honorary degrees ==
- 2002 – University of Ghent, Belgium
- 2006 – Russian Academy of Sciences
- 2007 – Lodz University of Technology, Poland
- 2008 – University of Athens, Greece
- 2010 – l'Institut Polytechnique, Toulouse, France
- 2013 – Pusan National University, Busan, South Korea
- 2013 – Universite P. & M. Curie, Sorbonne, Paris, France
- 2015 – Technion, Haifa, Israel
- 2016 – Adam Mickiewicz University in Poznań, Poznań, Poland
- 2017 – University of Padua, Padua, Italy
- 2018 – University of Coimbra, Coimbra, Portugal
- 2023 – University of Crete, Greece
- 2024 – Rzeszow University of Technology in 2024
- 2026 – Jan Dlugosz University, Częstochowa, Poland

=== Visiting professorships ===
- ESPCI ParisTech, 2011
- University of Pusan, 2010
- Lodz University of Technology, 2009
- University of Tokyo, Fellow of the Japanese Society of the Promotion of Science, 2005
- University of Paris, 1985, 1990, 1997, 1998, 2005
- University of Bordeaux, 1996, 2004
- Michigan Molecular Institute, 2004
- University of Pisa, Italy, 2000
- University of Ulm, 1999
- University of Strasbourg, 1992
- University of Beyreuth, 1991
- University of Freiburg, 1988

== See also ==
- List of Poles
- Timeline of Polish science and technology
