= Dryfoos =

Dryfoos is a surname. It is an anglicized variation of the German surnames Dreifuss, Dreyfuss or Dreyfus. Notable people with the surname include:

- Joy G. Dryfoos (1925–2012), American sociologist
- Nancy Proskauer Dryfoos (1918–1991) American sculptor
- Orvil Dryfoos (1912–1963), American newspaper publisher

== See also ==
- Dreyfus (surname)
- Dreifuss (surname)
