= Dreyfus (surname) =

Dreyfus (Yiddish: דרײפֿוס)
Origin
- Meaning: Borrowed from German Dreifuß, an older name for Trèves (Trier), from Latin Augusta Trēverōrum.
- Region of origin: Trier, Germany

Other names
- Variant form: Dreyfuss

Dreyfus is a surname of German origin. Notable people with the surname include:

== Actors ==
- Alexandra Dreyfus (born 1986), American actress
- Chuckie Dreyfus (born 1974), Filipino actor
- James Dreyfus (born 1968), English actor
- Jean-Claude Dreyfus (born 1946), French actor
- Julie Dreyfus (born 1966), French actress
- Julia Louis-Dreyfus (born 1961), American actress and comedian
- Anouk Aimée (born Dreyfus, 1932–2024), French actress

== Other people ==
- Alfred Dreyfus (1859–1935), French Jewish military officer and focus of the Dreyfus affair
- Auguste Dreyfus (1827–1897), French guano merchant, financier
- Camille Dreyfus (chemist) (1878–1956), Swiss chemist
- Camille Ferdinand Dreyfus (1849–1915), French lawyer who was Senator for Seine-et-Oise from 1909 to 1915
- Charles Dreyfus (1848–1935), British-French Zionist and businessman
- Édouard Dreyfus Gonzalez (1876–1941) French lawyer and composer as "Jean Dora"
- Ferdinand-Camille Dreyfus (1851–1915), French journalist and politician
- Francis Dreyfus (1940–2010), French record producer, father of Julie Dreyfus
- George Dreyfus (born 1928), Australian composer, father of Mark Dreyfus
- Gérard Louis-Dreyfus (1932–2016), French-American businessman (Louis Dreyfus Group), father of Julia Louis-Dreyfus, cousin of Robert Louis-Dreyfus
- Harry Dreyfus (1891–1978), American businessman implicated in the Secret Court of 1920
- Henri Dreyfus (1882–1944), Swiss chemist and co-inventor of Celanese
- Henry Dreyfuss (1904–1972), industrial designer
- Hubert Dreyfus (1929–2017), American philosopher (University of California, Berkeley), brother of Stuart Dreyfus
- Huguette Dreyfus (1928–2016), French harpsichordist
- Jack Dreyfus (1913–2009), American financier, founder of the Dreyfus Corporation
- Jean-Marc Dreyfus, French historian
- Jérôme Dreyfus (born 1971), French judoka
- Karen Dreyfus, American violist
- Laurence Dreyfus (born 1952), American baroque music scholar and viol player
- Lee S. Dreyfus (1926–2008), American politician, Governor of Wisconsin (1979–1983)
- Madeleine Dreyfus (1909–1987), French Jewish resistor during World War II
- Mark Dreyfus (born 1956), Australian lawyer and politician, MP for Isaacs (2007–present), son of George Dreyfus
- Markus G. Dreyfus (1812–1877), Swiss Jewish teacher and publicist active in the struggle for the emancipation of Jews in Switzerland
- Max Dreyfus (1874–1964), German-born American music publisher
- Pablo Dreyfus (1969/70–2009), Argentine arms controller
- Philippe Dreyfus, French informatics pioneer
- Pierre Dreyfus (1907–1994), French civil servant, politician and businessman (Renault)
- René Dreyfus (1905–1993), French Grand Prix motor racing driver
- Robert Louis-Dreyfus (1946–2009), French businessman (Adidas-Salomon), cousin of Gérard Louis-Dreyfus
- Stuart Dreyfus, American academic, engineer and author (University of California, Berkeley), brother of Hubert Dreyfus
- Tony Dreyfus (1939–2023), French politician, Member of the National Assembly for Paris (1997–2012)
- Yves Dreyfus (1931–2021), French Olympic fencer

== Fictional characters ==
- Chief Inspector Dreyfus, character in The Pink Panther film series
- Dreyfus, the main human antagonist in the 2014 film Dawn of the Planet of the Apes
- Shosanna [sic = Shoshanna] Dreyfus, one of the principal characters in Inglourious Basterds

== See also ==
- Dreyfuss
