= TCX Technology =

TCX Technology is the brand name for a hydrocarbon-based ethanol production process developed and marketed by Celanese Corporation. Celanese researchers developed the TCX Technology in its Clear Lake City, Texas plant under the direction of its CEO to create a fuel that helps countries reduce their need to import oil and gas. Celanese launched the TCX Technology in November 2010 and plans to invest $700 million to build one-to-two plants in China and one in Texas that will produce TCX-based ethanol. Celanese expects to produce approximately 300 million gallons of TCX ethanol by 2016.

== Process ==
In the TCX process, natural gas or other hydrocarbons are first converted to acetic acid. Thereafter, acetic acid is hydrogenated (presumably obtained by methane reforming) to give ethanol; a supported platinum-tin catalyst for this purpose was patented by Celanese. Starting from coal, it is gasified. Impurities such as mercury and cadmium are removed, before further reaction.

Celanese claims to be able to produce hydrocarbon-based ethanol for a cost of $1.50 to $1.75 per gallon.

== Uses ==
TCX can function as a fuel additive to operate vehicles and in industrial-grade applications to manufacture paints, coatings, inks and pharmaceuticals. It is intended for use in countries or regions wanting to lessen dependence on imported energy and with easy access to plentiful hydrocarbons. These include China, Middle East, Southeast Asia, South America, United States and other developing and growing countries.
