= James G. Anderson =

American atmospheric chemist (born 1944)

- Born: 1944 (age 81–82); Spokane, Washington, U.S.
- Education: University of Washington (BS, 1966); University of Colorado Boulder (PhD, 1970)
- Known for: In situ measurement of stratospheric free radicals; evidence linking CFCs to Antarctic ozone loss
- Awards: Ernest Orlando Lawrence Award (1993); Arthur L. Day Prize and Lectureship (1996); Dreyfus Prize in the Chemical Sciences (2021)
- Scientific career
- Fields: Atmospheric chemistry
- Workplaces: Harvard University
- Thesis: Rocket borne ultraviolet spectrometer measurement of OH resonance fluorescence with a diffusive transport model for mesospheric photochemistry (1970)
- Doctoral students: Andrew Dessler

James Gilbert Anderson (born 1944) is an American atmospheric chemist and the Philip S. Weld Professor of Atmospheric Chemistry at Harvard University, where he is a member of the departments of Chemistry and Chemical Biology, Earth and Planetary Sciences, and the School of Engineering and Applied Sciences. He is known for in situ measurements of free radicals in the stratosphere, including airborne measurements of chlorine monoxide in the Antarctic ozone hole that provided evidence linking chlorofluorocarbons (CFCs) to ozone loss. His later work has addressed ozone chemistry over the United States, greenhouse gas fluxes in the Arctic, and high-altitude platforms for climate observation. He is a member of the National Academy of Sciences and received the 2021 Dreyfus Prize in the Chemical Sciences.

== Early life and education ==
Anderson was born in 1944 in Spokane, Washington. He received a BS in physics from the University of Washington in 1966 and a PhD from the University of Colorado in 1970; his doctoral thesis concerned rocket-borne ultraviolet spectrometer measurements of hydroxyl (OH) in the mesosphere. He then held postdoctoral and research positions at the University of Pittsburgh and the University of Michigan.

== Career ==
Anderson joined the Harvard faculty in 1978 as the Robert P. Burden Professor of Atmospheric Chemistry and was appointed Weld Professor in 1982. He chaired Harvard's Department of Chemistry and Chemical Biology from 1998 to 2001. According to Harvard, he has testified before committees of the US Senate and House of Representatives on energy and climate issues.

== Research ==
=== Stratospheric free radicals and Antarctic ozone loss ===
Anderson's group developed airborne and balloon-borne instruments for detecting short-lived free radicals in the stratosphere by resonance fluorescence. In 1987 the Airborne Antarctic Ozone Experiment flew instrumented NASA ER-2 and DC-8 aircraft into the Antarctic ozone hole to study its cause. Instruments built by Anderson's group on the ER-2 made the first in situ detection of chlorine monoxide (ClO) in the stratosphere, and the data showed that ozone was low where ClO was high. Because ClO is a product of the reactions in which chlorine destroys ozone, the anticorrelation was regarded as strong evidence that chlorine from human-made compounds was responsible for the ozone loss. The results were published in 1989 and 1991, and a tribute to Anderson in The Journal of Physical Chemistry A described the data as helping to galvanize international action leading to amendments of the Montreal Protocol. In 2005 the United Nations Environment Programme honored him with the Vienna Convention Award for the protection of the ozone layer.

=== Ozone and convective injection over the United States ===
In 2012 Anderson and colleagues reported in Science that deep convective storms over the United States in summer inject water vapor into the lower stratosphere, which could shift chlorine into its catalytically active form and increase the rate of ozone loss. The authors wrote that the risk of ozone loss would rise if the frequency or intensity of such convection increased with climate forcing. Other scientists described the proposal as intriguing but cautioned that the process had not been observed directly within a convective event over the United States.

=== Arctic emissions and climate observation ===
Anderson has also studied greenhouse gas emissions in the Arctic. He is a co-author of a 2017 study that used a small, low-flying aircraft over the North Slope of Alaska to measure regional methane fluxes by eddy covariance; the study found that wet sedge areas dominated the methane flux in the area surveyed in August 2013. He is also a co-author of a 2014 paper proposing the Stratospheric Controlled Perturbation Experiment (SCoPEx), a small-scale balloon experiment intended to improve understanding of the risks of solar geoengineering. He has worked on solar-powered, high-altitude aircraft concepts for climate observation for about three decades and leads the Harvard branch of the NASA-funded Stratospheric Airborne Climate Observing System (SACOS).

=== Climate Forecasting Observatory (SACOS) ===
The Stratospheric Airborne Climate Observatory System (SACOS) is described by its MIT collaborators as an ensemble of unmanned, solar-powered aircraft that would operate for weeks or months in the stratosphere, each designed together with instruments for climate-observing missions that satellites or conventional aircraft cannot fulfill. Proposed missions include sampling of stratospheric aerosols, in situ measurement of storm-driven stratospheric chemistry, monitoring of ice shelves, glaciers and coastal flooding, and drought and wildfire prediction. Anderson's group at Harvard also refers to the concept as the Climate Forecasting Observatory.

In September 2022 Electra.aero completed the first flight of Dawn One, a 90-foot-wingspan unmanned solar-battery hybrid electric research aircraft built as part of SACOS, from Manassas Regional Airport in Virginia; the aircraft design originated at MIT. The project is supported by contracts from NASA and the Weld Foundation for Scientific and Environmental Development. Anderson has said that SACOS observations are intended to support quantitative forecasts of risk from rapidly expanding wildfires, accelerating sea level rise, intensifying severe storms, and shifts in arid regions that cause water shortages. A Harvard-led study of battery requirements for solar stratospheric aircraft, which identified an energy density of 500 watt-hours per kilogram as an important threshold, was featured on the cover of ACS Energy Letters; Harvard described wildfire monitoring among the potential applications.

== Awards and honors ==
- 1989: ACS Award for Creative Advances in Environmental Science and Technology, American Chemical Society
- 1993: E. O. Lawrence Award in environmental science and technology (the first given in that category), US Department of Energy
- 1993: Gustavus John Esselen Award for Chemistry in the Public Interest, Northeastern Section of the American Chemical Society
- 1996: Arthur L. Day Prize and Lectureship, National Academy of Sciences
- 2005: UNEP/WMO Vienna Convention Award for the Protection of the Ozone Layer
- 2012: American Ingenuity Award in the Physical Sciences, Smithsonian magazine
- 2016: Michael Polanyi Medal for free radical kinetics, Royal Society of Chemistry
- 2016: Benton Medal, University of Chicago
- 2017: Lichtenberg Medal, Göttingen Academy of Sciences and Humanities
- 2019: Alumnus Summa Laude Dignatus, University of Washington
- 2021: Dreyfus Prize in the Chemical Sciences

He has also received Harvard University's George Ledlie Prize.

Anderson was elected to the American Academy of Arts and Sciences in 1985, the National Academy of Sciences in 1992, and the American Philosophical Society in 1998. He is also a fellow of the American Association for the Advancement of Science (1986) and the American Geophysical Union (1989).
