= Tattler =

Tattler may refer to:

- A person who likes to tattle, gossip or "telltale"
- Tattler (语丝) important Chinese weekly journal founded in 1924
- The Tattler, the student newspaper of Ithaca High School in Ithaca, New York
- Tattler (bird), a shorebird
- Tattler (newsletter), the "Newsletter for the East Asian-Australasian Flyway"
- "Tattler", a song by Ry Cooder on his 1974 album Paradise and Lunch
- "The Tattler", a song by Linda Ronstadt on her 1976 album Hasten Down the Wind, a cover of the Ry Cooder song
- "The Tattler" (Brooklyn Nine-Nine), an episode of the sixth season of Brooklyn Nine-Nine

== See also ==
- "You Can't Stop a Tattler", a 1929 song by Washington Phillips on which the songs by Ry Cooder and Linda Ronstadt are based
- Tatler (disambiguation)
- Tattletale (disambiguation)
