= Dreyfuss =

Dreyfuss is a surname of German origin. Notable people with this surname include:

- Barney Dreyfuss (1865–1932), baseball entrepreneur, co-founder of the World Series
- Gideon Dreyfuss, molecular biologist, Howard Hughes Medical Institute and University of Pennsylvania
- Henry Dreyfuss (1904–1972), industrial designer
- Joel Dreyfuss (born 1945), editor-in-chief of Red Herring
- Laura Dreyfuss (born 1988), American actress
- Richard Dreyfuss (born 1947), American actor
- Robert Dreyfuss, American freelance investigative journalist
- Rochelle C. Dreyfuss, American law professor

== See also ==
- Dreyfus (disambiguation), Dreyfus (surname)
- Dreifuss
- Orvil Dryfoos (1912–1963), publisher of The New York Times from 1961 to 1963
