= Kathryn Beers =

American materials chemist

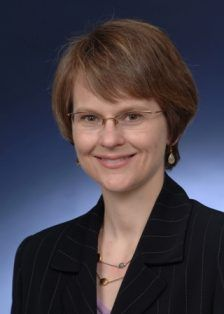
- Education: College of William & Mary (BS); Carnegie Mellon University (MS, PhD)
- Awards: Department of Commerce Silver Medal (2005); Presidential Early Career Award for Scientists and Engineers (2007)
- Scientific career
- Fields: Materials chemistry
- Workplaces: National Institute of Standards and Technology
- Doctoral advisor: Krzysztof Matyjaszewski

Kathryn L. Beers is an American polymer chemist. Beers is Leader of the Polymers and Complex Fluids group in the Materials Science and Engineering Division at the National Institute of Standards and Technology. Her research interests include microreactors and microfluidics, advances in polymer synthesis and reaction monitoring, macromolecular separations, integrated and high throughput measurements of polymeric materials, degradable and renewable polymeric materials, and sustainable materials.

== Early life and education ==
Beers is a native of the Washington metropolitan area. She completed a B.S. in chemistry at the College of William & Mary in 1994. Her Honors College undergraduate thesis was titled The effects of deuteration of ferromagnetic properties: a study of single crystal Fe[S_{2}CN(C_{2}D_{5})_{2}]_{2}Cl. In 1996, she earned an M.S. in polymer science at Carnegie Mellon University. She completed a Ph.D. in chemistry at Carnegie Mellon in 2000. She worked with professor Krzysztof Matyjaszewski. Her dissertation was titled Design, synthesis and properties of comb copolymers with variable grafting density by controlled radical polymerization. From 2000 to 2002, she was a National Research Council postdoctoral fellow in the Polymers Division at the National Institute of Standards and Technology (NIST).

== Career ==
From 2002 to 2007, Beers was a research chemist and project leader in the polymer formulations at the NIST Combinatorial Methods Center (NCMC) in the Polymers Division at NIST. Beers was the Assistant Director for Physical Sciences and Engineering in the Office of Science and Technology Policy (OSTP) from 2007 to 2008. While at OSTP, Beers oversaw a portfolio including the Office of Science, Science Mission Directorate, and portions of the National Science Foundation. She worked to coordinate inter-agency and international cooperation and interaction with the physical science field. She was the director of the NIST Combinatorial Methods Center (NCMC) from 2008 to 2009. From 2008 to 2012, she was a Project Leader of the Renewable Polymers project, and Group Leader of the Sustainable Polymers Group. Since 2013, Beers serves as Group Leader of the Polymers and Complex Fluids group in the Materials Science and Engineering Division at NIST.

Beers became a member of the American Chemical Society (ACS) in 1993. She has served as secretary of the ACS Division of Polymer Chemistry and served in the POLY Chair series from 2012 to 2017. She became a member of the Materials Research Society in 2001 and Sigma Xi in 2004. She is also a member of the American Institute of Chemical Engineers.

=== Research ===
Beers researches microreactors and microfluidics, advances in polymer synthesis and reaction monitoring, macromolecular separations, integrated and high throughput measurements of polymeric materials, degradable and renewable polymeric materials, and sustainable materials.

== Awards and honors ==
In 2005, Beers was awarded the Department of Commerce Silver Medal. She was a 2006 Department of Commerce Science and Technology Policy (ComSci) fellow. In 2007, she received the Presidential Early Career Award for Scientists and Engineers.
