= Nutrinova =

German nutrition company

- Industry: Food Products
- Headquarters: Frankfurt, Germany
- Key people: Lori J. Ryerkerk, CEO
- Products: Dietary fibre products; Sorbic acid; "Sunett" sugar substitute
- Parent: Celanese
- Website: www.nutrinova.com

Nutrinova is a global manufacturer of food constituents. It was formerly a division of Hoechst until 1997 when it was taken over by Celanese and adopted its current name.

The company is headquartered in Frankfurt, Germany. It is a wholly owned affiliate of Celanese.

== Core operations ==
Nutrinova is the discoverer and producer of Acesulfame potassium ("Sunett") sugar substitute. It is the world's largest producer of sorbic acid and related sorbates, which are used as preservatives. It is also a producer of dietary fibre products. In 2021, Nutrinova placed 25th on the Top 50 Global Sweetener Companies list published by FoodTalks.
