= Dreifuss =

Dreifuss is a surname of German origin. Notable people with the surname include:

- Arthur Dreifuss (1908–1993), American film director
- Fritz E. Dreifuss (1926–1997), American neurologist
- Ruth Dreifuss (born 1940), Swiss politician

== See also ==
- Dryfoos (surname)
- Dreyfus (disambiguation)
- Dreyfuss
- Claudia Dreifus, American journalist
