= Hinckley power station =

Power station in Leicestershire, England

- Country: England
- Location: Hinckley Leicestershiire
- Coordinates: 52°31′53″N 01°23′44″W
- Status: Decommissioned, Demolished
- Commission date: 1903
- Owners: Leicestershire and Warwickshire Electric Power Company Limited

Thermal power station
- Primary fuel: Coal
- Turbine technology: Steam raising for engine and steam turbines
- Cooling source: Canal water

Hinckley power station supplied electricity to the town of Hinckley and the wider Leicestershire area from 1913. It was operated by the Leicestershire and Warwickshire Electric Power Company until nationalization of the British electricity supply industry in 1948. The power station continued operation until the early 1950s.

== Background ==
The Leicestershire and Warwickshire Electric Power Company was incorporated in 1902 under the Leicestershire and Warwickshire Electric Power Act 1902 (2 Edw. 7. c. cxxxi). Its aim was to supply electricity throughout the counties of Leicestershire and Warwickshire. In 1912 the company's entire share holding was acquired by the Tramway Electric and Power Company. Both company's offices in 1915 were in 66 Queen Street, London E.C.

The Leicestershire and Warwickshire Electric Power Company assessed the location for a power station. Sites at the junction of Watling Street and the Hinckley-Nuneaton road; at Glenfield adjacent to the railway; and at Measham between the Ashby canal and the railway. A location in Hinckley was eventually selected.

Hinckley power station was in Nutts Lane, Hinckley (52°31′53″N 1°23′44″W). The site was adjacent to the railway from which a siding facilitated delivery of coal, and was also adjacent to the Ashby canal which also allowed the delivery of coal and provided cooling water for the power station.

== Electricity generation ==
=== Plant in 1915 ===
In 1915 electricity was produced by two 750 kW Willans-Siemens steam alternators plus one 200 kW Belliss & Morcom-ECC steam alternator. The total plant capacity was 1,700 kW. There was a 3-phase, 50 Hz, 6,600 Volt main system (21 miles long) and a four wire 440 Volt low tension system.

=== Plant in 1923 ===
In 1923 the plant comprised:

- Boilers: 90,000 lb/hr (11.3 kg/s), which fed:
- Generators
  - 1 × 200 kW reciprocating engine
  - 2 × 1,000 kW turbo-alternators
  - 1 × 3,000 kW turbo-alternator

Total generating capacity was 5,200 kW.

In 1923 the station generated 9,139 MWh and sold 6,924 MWh of electricity. The maximum load was 3,830 KW and there were 3,830 connections on the system.

=== Plant in 1937 ===
In 1937 the plant comprised:

- Boilers:
  - 1 × 8,000 lb/hr (1.00 kg/s)
  - 2 × 10,000 lb/hr (1.26 kg/s)
  - 2 × 20,000 lb/hr (2.52 kg/s)
  - 2 × 23,000 lb/hr (2.90 kg/s)
- The boilers produced a total of 114,000 lb/hr (14.36 kg/s) of steam, this supplied:
- Generators:
  - 2 × 1,000 kW turbo alternators
  - 2 × 3,000 kW turbo alternators

The amount of electricity generated in 1937 was 14,841 MWh.

=== Plant in 1950 ===
In 1950 the plant comprised:

- Boilers
  - 2 × Babcock and Wilcox Land type each 23,000 lb/hr (2.89 kg/s)
  - 2 × Babcock and Wilcox CTM each 20,000 lb/hr (2.52 kg/s)
  - The total steam capacity was 86,000 lb/hr (10.83 kg/s), which fed
- Turboalternators
  - 2 × 3 MW Metro-Vickers turboalternators.

The electricity supplied by Hinckley power station in the post war period is shown in the table.

Hinckley power station output
Year	Maximum load MW	Electricity supplied MWh
1946	5.8	3,445
1947	6.1	6,498
1948	6.0	7,435
1950	6.0	5,508

The Leicestershire and Warwickshire Electric Power Company Limited was abolished on 31 March 1948 under the provisions of the Electricity Act 1947 which nationalized the electricity supply industry. The generating plant was vested in the British Electricity Authority and the distribution infrastructure in the East Midlands Electricity Board. The Leicestershire and Warwickshire supply area became a sub-area of the East Midlands Board.

Hinckley power station was decommissioned in the 1953/54 financial year.
