= Leicestershire and Warwickshire Electric Power Company =

English electric power company

- Company type: Public company
- Industry: Electricity generation and supply
- Founded: 1902
- Defunct: 31 March 1948
- Fate: Nationalisation
- Successor: British Electricity Authority, East Midlands Electricity Board
- Area served: Leicestershire and Warwickshire
- Services: Electricity generation and supply

The Leicestershire and Warwickshire Electric Power Company provided electricity to consumers in parts of the English midland counties of Leicestershire and Warwickshire. Electricity was supplied by the company from 1913 until the nationalization of the electricity supply industry in 1948.

== Foundation ==
Leicestershire and Warwickshire Electric Power Act 1902
- Act of Parliament
- Parliament of the United Kingdom
- Long title: An Act for incorporating and conferring powers on the Leicestershire and Warwickshire Electric Power Company.
- Citation: 2 Edw. 7. c. cxxxi

Dates
- Royal assent: 28 April 1902

The Leicestershire and Warwickshire Electric Power Company was incorporated in 1902. Its powers derived from the provisions of the Leicestershire and Warwickshire Electric Power Act 1902 (2 Edw. 7. c. cxxxi). Its aim was to supply electricity throughout the counties of Leicestershire and Warwickshire. The company was one of the pioneering power companies that were founded from around 1900. This new type of enterprise operated at a larger scale at county and regional level, rather than the local authority areas of earlier undertakings. Another power company in the East Midlands was the Derbyshire and Nottinghamshire Electric Power Company, established in 1901.

== Early plans ==
Leicestershire and Warwickshire Electric Power Act 1904
- Act of Parliament
- Parliament of the United Kingdom
- Long title: An Act to confer further powers upon the Leicestershire and Warwickshire Electric Power Company and for other purposes.
- Citation: 4 Edw. 7. c. lxxiii

Dates
- Royal assent: 22 July 1904

Text of statute as originally enacted

The company obtained further powers under the Leicestershire and Warwickshire Electric Power Act 1904 (4 Edw. 7. c. lxxiii). This extended the period in which works on power stations should commence. Furthermore, it did not limit the construction of power stations to those sites specified in the 1902 Act.

The ambitious plans of the Leicestershire and Warwickshire company were to be realised through the construction of six new power stations. These were located at Glenfield (north-west of Leicester), Hinckley, Leek Wooton, Measham, Newbold-on-Avon and Whitacre. In the event these plans were abandoned and little development took place. Only one power station was built at Hinckley and then not until 1913. The Hinckley power station had an installed capacity of 1,700 kW.

== Acquisition ==
In 1912 the Leicestershire and Warwickshire Company's entire share and loan capital was acquired by the Tramway Light and Power Company Limited. This company was founded in 1912 by the engineer George Balfour to acquire the assets and operating rights of electricity undertakings. In addition to the Leicestershire and Warwickshire company, it acquired the Derbyshire and Nottinghamshire Electric Power Company, the Midland Electric Light and Power Company Ltd, plus several traction or tramway companies. The Tramway Light and Power Company was renamed the Midland Counties Electric Supply Company Ltd in 1921, see Midland Electric Light and Power Company Limited.

The Leicestershire and Warwickshire Power Company built a new power station at Emscote, Warwick in 1920. The station was built adjacent to the River Avon and was also known as the Avon station, it had a generating capacity of 6,000 kW. Operating parameters of the two stations in 1923 are summarised in the table.

Avon and Hinckley plant 1923
Parameter	Avon section	Hinckley section
Consumer voltage	12 kV, 6.6 kV	433 & 250 V
Boiler plant lb/hr	80,000	90,000
Generators	2 × 3 MW	1 × 0.2 MW 2 × 1 MW 1 × 3 MW
Maximum load MW	2.15	3.83
No. of connections	2,890	6,778
Electricity sold MWh	7,179	6,924

The company obtained further powers under the Leicestershire and Warwickshire Electric Power Act, 1926, (16 & 17 Geo. 5. xxxiv). This increased the monies that the company may use on operation and construction of new plant.

The National Grid was constructed from 1927. A 132 kV line provided an export route from Hinckley to Coventry and thence to the 132 kV central midland ring. The ring comprised Hams Hill, Coventry, Leicester, Nottingham, Burton-on-Trent and Spondon.

== Power company ==
By 1937 the Leicestershire and Warwickshire company was operating as a power company, by generating or otherwise acquiring electric current for local undertakings. The extent of the electricity supply is shown in the table.

Undertakings supplied by the Leicestershire and Warwickshire Company 1937
Authorized undertaker	Sales MWh	Sales £
Atherstone & District	706	9,151
Barrow-on-Soar & District	2,355	23,288
Bedworth & Bulkington	814	11,328
Castle Donington	743	8,829
Colville	3,096	38,350
East Leicester	871	7,826
Fleckney, Kilsworth & District	739	6,661
Henley-in-Arden	1,077	7,163
Hinckley	2,545	31,432
Lutterworh & Rugby	2,966	25,367
Market Bosworth	1,642	17,042
Mid-Warwick	1,264	10,518
Napton & District	101	997
Southam & District	815	6,701
Wigston Magna, Blaby & District	2,839	31,561
Power Undertaking	126,803	376,057
Total	149,376	612,271

== Abolition ==
The Leicestershire and Warwickshire Power Company was abolished on 31 March 1948 under the provisions of the Electricity Act 1947 which nationalized the British electricity supply industry. The generating plant was vested in the British Electricity Authority and the distribution infrastructure in the East Midlands Electricity Board. The supply area of the Leicestershire & Warwickshire Power Company broadly corresponded to the Leicestershire and Warwickshire subarea of the East Midlands Board.

Generation of electricity ceased at Hinckley power station in 1954. The Warwick (Avon) power station continued to generate electricity until 1973.

== See also ==
- Timeline of the UK electricity supply industry
- List of pre-nationalisation UK electric power companies
- Derbyshire and Nottinghamshire Electric Power Company
- Bedfordshire, Cambridgeshire and Huntingdonshire Electricity Company
