= Tatler (disambiguation) =

Tatler may refer to:

== Publishing ==
- The Tatler, a British literary and society journal (1709–1711)
- The Female Tatler, a British women's literary and society journal (1709–1710)
- The Tatler Reviv'd, a British literary and society journal (1727–1728)
- The Tatler: A Daily Journal of Literature and the Stage, a British literary and theatre journal (1830–1832)
- Irish Tatler, an Irish society magazine (1890–present)
- Tatler, a British society magazine (1901–present)
  - Tatler Asia, a Hong Kong edition of Tatler; now an un-related publishing company (1977–present)
- Ulster Tatler, a Northern Irish society and lifestyle magazine (1966–present)
- Southern Suburbs Tatler, a South African newspaper (1979–present)

== Music ==
- "The Tatler", 1999 song by Billy Bragg
- "Tatler Magazine", 2018 song by The Struts

== Sports ==
- Hong Kong v Inter Miami '2024 Tatler XFEST', a friendly football match
- Sphere and Tatler Foursomes Tournament, a golf tournament

== People ==
- Brian Tatler (born 1960), British musician
- Shama Tatler, Baroness Shah (born 1983), British politician
- Tatler Tory, nickname of Mark Clarke (born 1977), British politician

== See also ==
- Tattler (disambiguation)
- Tattletale (disambiguation)
- Tatle (disambiguation)
