= Tatle =

Tatle may refer to:

- Tatl, a character from The Legend of Zelda
- to tattle, to gossip
- Tittle

== See also ==
- Tatler (disambiguation)
