= Maison de la Chimie =

International conference centre in Paris, France

Coordinates: 48.860056°N 2.316837°E

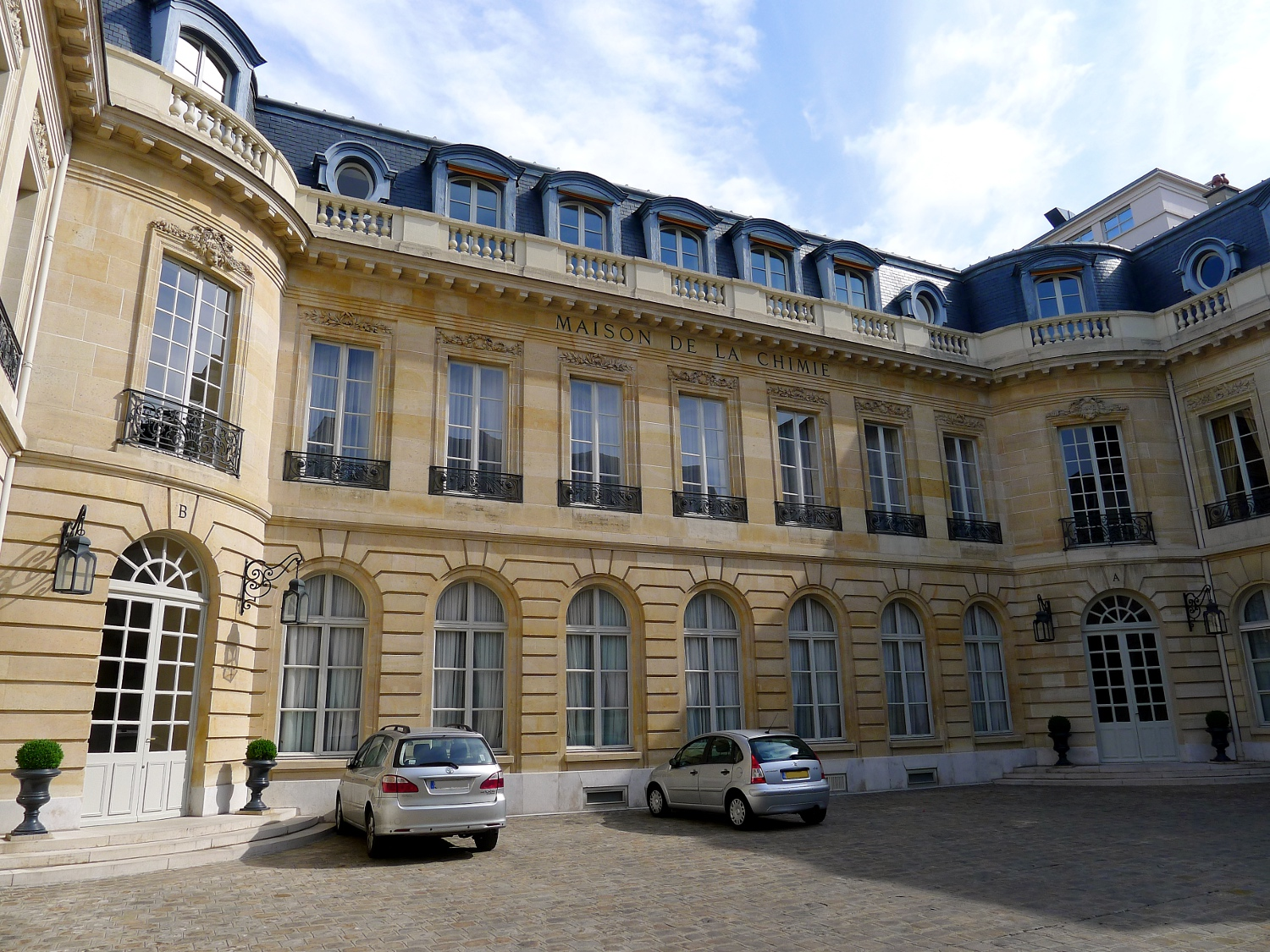
Maison de la Chimie

The Maison de la Chimie (French pronunciation: [mɛzɔ̃ d(ə) la ʃimi]; lit. 'House of Chemistry') is an international conference centre at 28, Rue Saint-Dominique in the 7th arrondissement of Paris, France. It is located in the Faubourg Saint-Germain near the National Assembly.

The house is managed by a nonprofit association, the Fondation de la Maison de la Chimie. Its primary objective is to assist and help scientists and engineers working in the field of chemistry, through the organisation of meetings, colloquia and conferences.

The house provides office space to various associations involved in scientific and technological fields. The headquarters of the Société Astronomique de France was located in the house from 1966 to 1974.

Halls and rooms are also rented for meetings whose topics lie outside the field of chemistry; these other usages actually represent 75% to 80% of the activity. Because of its central location in Paris, near the National Assembly and several ministries, the house is particularly sought for meetings with elected officials.

== Access ==
Located near the Metro station: Invalides.

== See also ==
- Maison de la Mutualité
