= Jean-Marc Dreyfus =

French historian

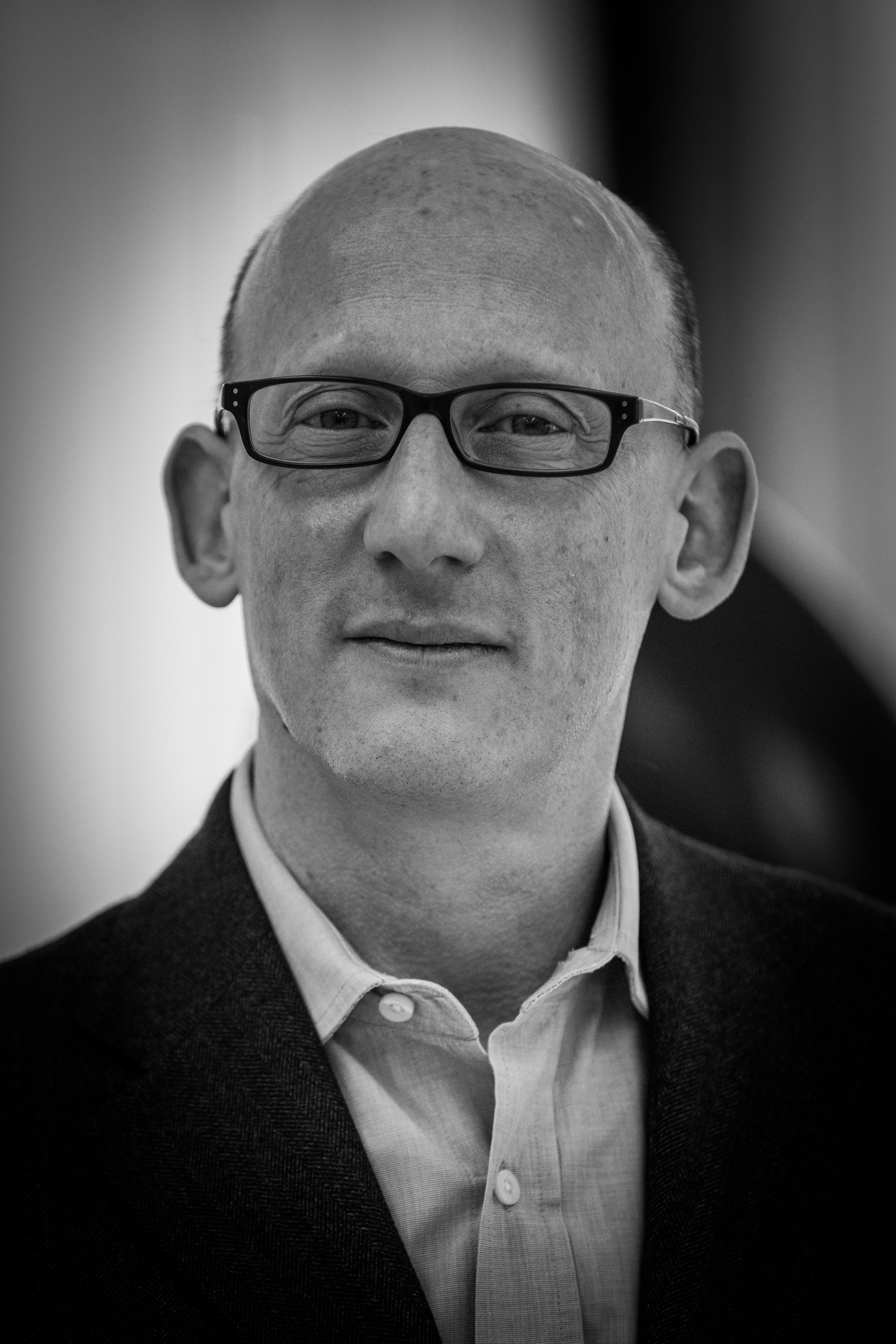
Jean-Marc Dreyfus in 2014

Jean-Marc Dreyfus is a French historian. His PhD thesis (2000) was about Jewish-owned banks in Aryanization and restitution. Dreyfus currently works as a professor in history at Manchester University.

== Works ==
- Dreyfus, Jean-Marc (2003). Pillages sur ordonnances: aryanisation et restitution des banques en France, 1940-1953 (in French). Fayard. ISBN 978-2-213-61327-7.
- Dreyfus, Jean-Marc; Gensburger, Sarah (2013). Nazi Labour Camps in Paris: Austerlitz, Lévitan, Bassano, July 1943-August 1944. Berghahn Books. ISBN 978-1-78238-113-6.
- Dreyfus, Jean-Marc (2015). L'Impossible Réparation: Déportés, biens spoliés, or nazi, comptes bloqués, criminels de guerre (in French). Flammarion. ISBN 978-2-08-135712-9.
- François-Poncet, André; Dreyfus, Jean-Marc (2016). Les rapports de Berlin: André François-Poncet et le national-socialisme (in French). Fayard. ISBN 978-2-213-66598-6. OCLC 960705985.
