= Camille Dreyfus (chemist) =

Swiss chemist (1878–1956)

- Born: November 11, 1878; Basel, Switzerland
- Died: September 27, 1956 (aged 77); Manhattan, New York, United States
- Resting place: Salem Fields Cemetery, Cypress Hills, New York
- Occupation: Chemist
- Known for: Celanese
- Spouse: Jean Tennyson

Camille Edouard Dreyfus (November 11, 1878 – September 27, 1956) was a Swiss chemist. He and his brother Henri Dreyfus invented Celanese, an acetate yarn. He founded The Camille and Henry Dreyfus Foundation in honour of his brother.

== Early years ==
Camille Dreyfus was born into a Jewish family from Basel, Switzerland in 1878. His parents were Abraham and Henrietta (née Wahl) Dreyfus. His brother Henri Dreyfus was born four years later, in 1882. The brothers both went to school in Basel and then studied at the Sorbonne, Paris. Their father was involved with a chemical factory. In 1901 Dreyfus earned a PhD from the University of Basel with the highest honors. The brothers began experimenting in a small laboratory in a corner of the garden of their father's house in Basel. Their first achievement was to develop synthetic indigo dyes.

In 1908 the two brothers turned to developing cellulose acetate, including scientific investigation of the properties of the compound and commercial exploitation. This would consume the rest of their lives. The initial goal was to create a safe and non-flammable alternative to celluloid, then used for motion pictures and photography. By 1910 they had perfected plastic film and acetate lacquers, or aircraft dope.

On 12 December 1912 Henri and Camille Dreyfus, funded by the entrepreneur Alexander Clavel-Respinger, set up a factory in Basel, Cellonit Gesellschaft Dreyfus & Co., to produce fireproof celluloid from cellulose acetate. The Cellonit company, founded in 1913, was innovative in developing new film materials. The Paris-based Pathé cinema equipment manufacturer became a customer, and the company's lacquers were used for German Zeppelins and airplanes. Demand for acetate lacquers grew steadily as the aircraft industry expanded.

== Britain ==
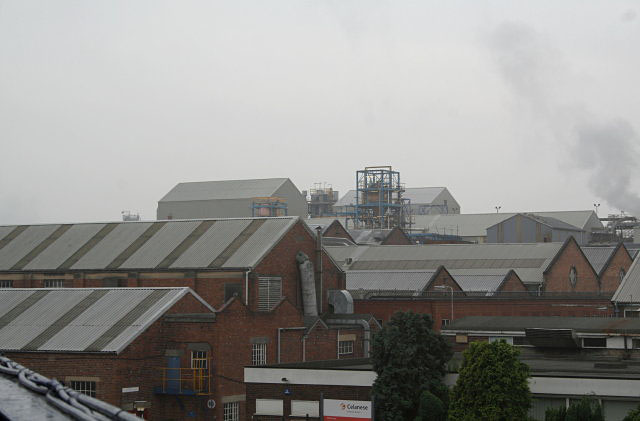
British Celanese factory, Spondon, Derbyshire

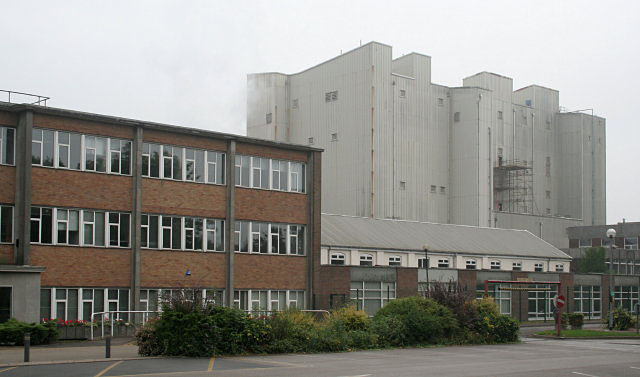
British Celanese acetate factory, Spondon, Derbyshire

Camille and Henri Dreyfus moved to Britain in 1916 during World War I (July 1914 - November 1918) to supervise construction of a factory to make cellulose acetate dope, used to make the wood-and-fabric airplanes of the day fire-resistant and waterproof. A company was established to operate the factory with 160,000 shares, of which the Dreyfus brothers and Alexander Clavel received 79,998, the Prudential Trust of Canada 40,470, Vickers Ltd. 19,800 and the remainder to smaller investors. The plant was built at Spondon, Derbyshire, and the brothers were housed at The Homestead, a large Georgian house. Many factors conspired to thwart Camille Dreyfus's plan to open the factory by August 1916, including labour issues, late delivery of equipment and shortage of supplies due to competing war-time priorities. In the meantime, cellulose acetate was delivered from the Basel factory under a 1915 contract.

The Megaloughton Lane plant was built by Alfred David McAlpine and was operated by the British Cellulose and Chemical Manufacturing company. A contract for forty tons of lacquer was signed in January 1917, and deliveries finally began in April 1917. By July 1917 there was a serious shortage of cellulose acetate, in part due to shortage of the raw materials. However, the company expanded fast, and moved into other products needed by the aircraft industry. The British Government patented Henri Dreyfus's process for producing acetic acid anhydride. By 1918, Henri Dreyfus was managing a workforce of 14,000.

The company's difficulties, including higher costs than expected, caught the public attention, and in August 1918 the Dreyfus brothers began to be attacked by anti-semites. G. K. Chesterton smeared them in the press, implying that they had no national loyalty and saying "International Israel is not always positively 'Pro-German' but it is for our purposes always negatively Pro-German. Camille Dreyfus was not around to defend himself, since he left in February 1918 to set up the American operation and did not return until July 1919. With the end of World War I all the paint contracts were cancelled and the company had to struggle to survive. The two brothers moved into new cellulose-based products including varnishes, paints and an artificial silk yarn that they called celanese. The company changed its name to British Celanese in 1923. Henri Dreyfus concentrated on technical development and running the British company for the rest of his life.

== United States ==
In 1917 the United States government asked the Dreyfus brothers to set up a cellulose factory in America. Camille Dreyfus went to New York in 1918, where he founded the American Cellulose & Chemical Manufacturing Company (Amcelle). That year Amcelle started to build a factory in Cumberland, Maryland. There were delays when demand collapsed with the end of the war, but Amcelle began to produce cellulose acetate at the Cumberland facility in 1924. Camille Dreyfus was skilled in finance, sales, and management. He took charge of developing the American operation, focused on consumer products. He came up with the brand name "Celanese" for the fibers and fabrics, which earned a solid reputation for quality.

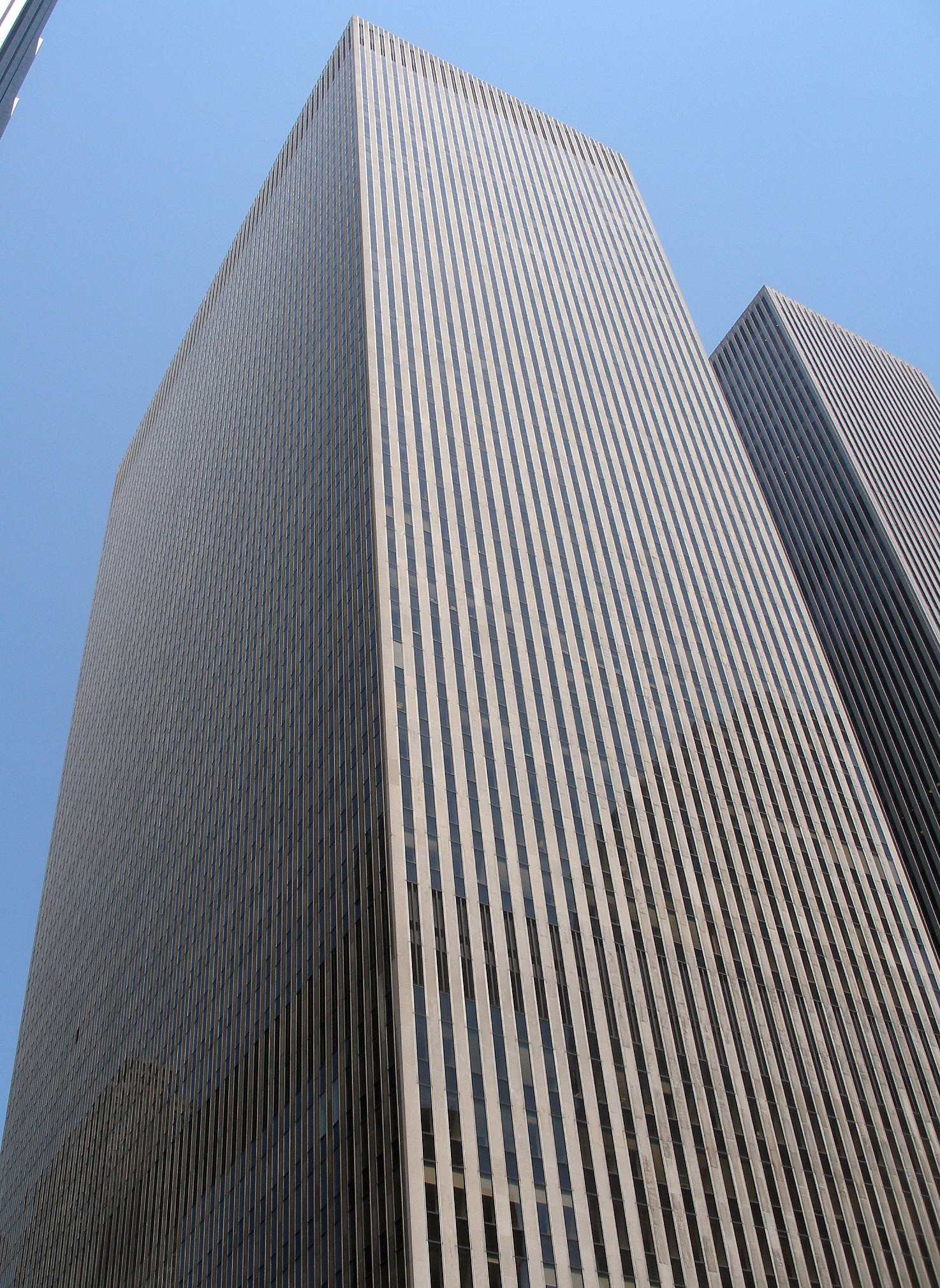
1211 Avenue of the Americas, formerly the Celanese Building, completed in 1973

In 1927 Amcelle bought the Celluloid Company of Newark, New Jersey and changed its name to the Celanese Corporation of America. The Celanese corporation went public, selling common and preferred shares, but the Dreyfus brothers retained control of the British parent and its American affiliate. As with other men who built industrial empires, Dreyfus was not particularly interested in building efficient administrative structures. At British Celanese and its subsidiary the Celanese Corporation of America the Dreyfus brothers minimized administrative and research spending in the 1920s, and lost market share to competitors in Germany and America that moved into products such as rayon and cellophane.

Until the start of World War II (1939–1945) the company was devoted to make cellulose acetate and using it in films, lacquers and fibres. It was only in 1940 that the Celanese Corporation started research into oxidation of butane and propane to prepare the acetic acid used in cellulose acetate. By 1945 its plant in Bishop, Texas was producing more than twenty petrochemical derivatives through vapor-phase oxidation of local liquefied gas.

When his brother Henri died in 1944, Camille Dreyfus also became managing director of British Celanese. In 1946 he set up the Henry Dreyfus Foundation in memory of his brother, "to advance the science of chemistry, chemical engineering and related sciences as a means of improving human relations and circumstances around the world." Camille was made an Officer of the Legion of Honour by the French Government, and earned the Modern Pioneer Award from the National Association of Manufacturers in America.

Camille Dreyfus was married once, to the opera singer Jean Tennyson (née Jean Tennyson Solberg). They were married on September 18, 1931, at the home of the leading reform Rabbi Jonah B. Wise (founder of the United Jewish Appeal).

Camille Dreyfus died in 1956. On his death the Dreyfus foundation was renamed The Camille and Henry Dreyfus Foundation. The foundation awards the biennial Dreyfus Prize in the Chemical Sciences to a person who has achieved a major advance in chemistry through exceptional and original research. His widow (who remarried in 1958 and became Jean Dreyfus Boissevain) created the Camille Dreyfus Laboratory grant in his memory. This funded construction of a research laboratory at the non-profit Research Triangle Institute (RTI) with equipment and $1.8 million for a ten-year basic research program into polymer physics and chemistry. The building opened in 1961 and was demolished in 2011. RTI renamed another room to the Camille Dreyfus Auditorium to continue his memory.
