= British Celanese =

British chemical company

Coordinates: 52.911°N 1.411°W

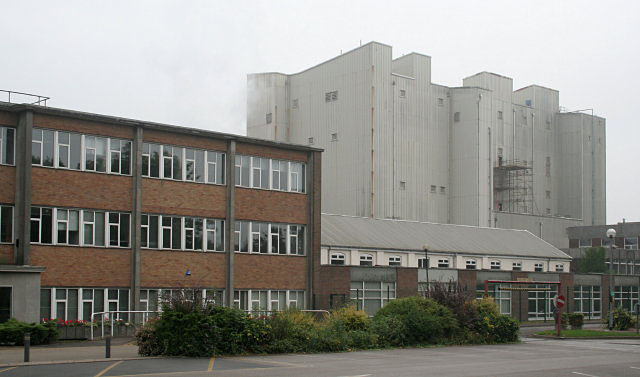
- British Celanese Factory at Spondon in Derby
- Industry: Acetate, Chemicals
- Predecessor: British Cellulose and Chemical Manufacturing Company ltd
- Founded: 1916; 1957 (under Courtaulds)
- Defunct: 2012 (except Clarifoil)
- Fate: Acquired
- Successor: Courtaulds
- Headquarters: Spondon
- Key people: Henri Dreyfus; Camille Dreyfus
- Products: Acetic acid, Acetate fibres

British Celanese was a chemical company based in England. Formed in 1916, it survived as an independent company until 1957 when it became a subsidiary of Courtaulds.

== History ==
The origins of the company lie with two brothers, Henri and Camille Dreyfus. In 1912, they set up "Cellonit Gesellschaft Dreyfus and Co" in Basel, Switzerland. In 1916, the brothers were invited to live in Britain by the British Government, to produce their recently developed cellulose acetate dope for the war effort; the canvas skins of aircraft of the time were sealed and made taut with nitrocellulose dope, which was easily ignited by bullets. They developed the necessary plant and "British Cellulose and Chemical Manufacturing Co" was registered on March 18, 1916. The British Government patented the process developed by Henri Dreyfus, which lowered the costs of acetic anhydride production, an important reagent in the production of cellulose acetate. At the end of World War I, the British Government cancelled all contracts and the company changed to produce acetate fibres. In 1923 the company name was changed to British Celanese Ltd, a contraction of cellulose and ease. Softer and stronger, as well as being cheaper to produce than other fabrics used at the time such as satin or taffeta, Celanese was used in the production of garments. In the interwar era, the company benefited from tariff protection extended to the rayon industry by the Finance Act of 1925. British Celanese was the first factory in Britain to produce propylene and from it isopropyl alcohol and acetone in 1942.

Clarifoil production developed out of cellulose acetate yarn technology. Clarifoil full-scale production commenced from 1947.

Henri Dreyfus died in 1944. Camille Dreyfus died in 1956.

In 1957, British Celanese was taken over by Courtaulds. The site is now operated by Celanese.

The plant with the exception of Clarifoil finally closed after the last shift on Wednesday 14 November 2012.

== Locations ==
British Celanese had its principal manufacturing facility at Spondon in Derby. The site was constructed between 1916 and 1918 by Sir Robert McAlpine with £5million provided by the War Office. Over 30 million bricks were used in the construction, and the original site covered 121 hectares.
