= Jimmy Hussey =

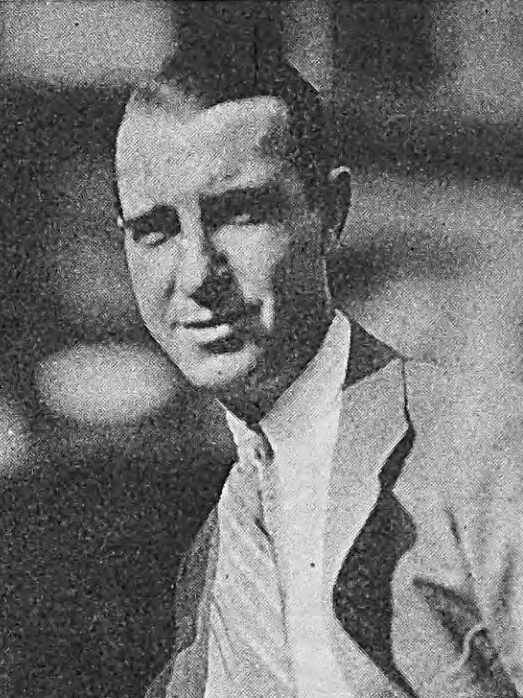
Jimmy Hussey, vaudeville comedian

Jimmy Hussey (January 18, 1891 – November 20, 1930) was an American comedian and vaudeville star.

== Biography ==
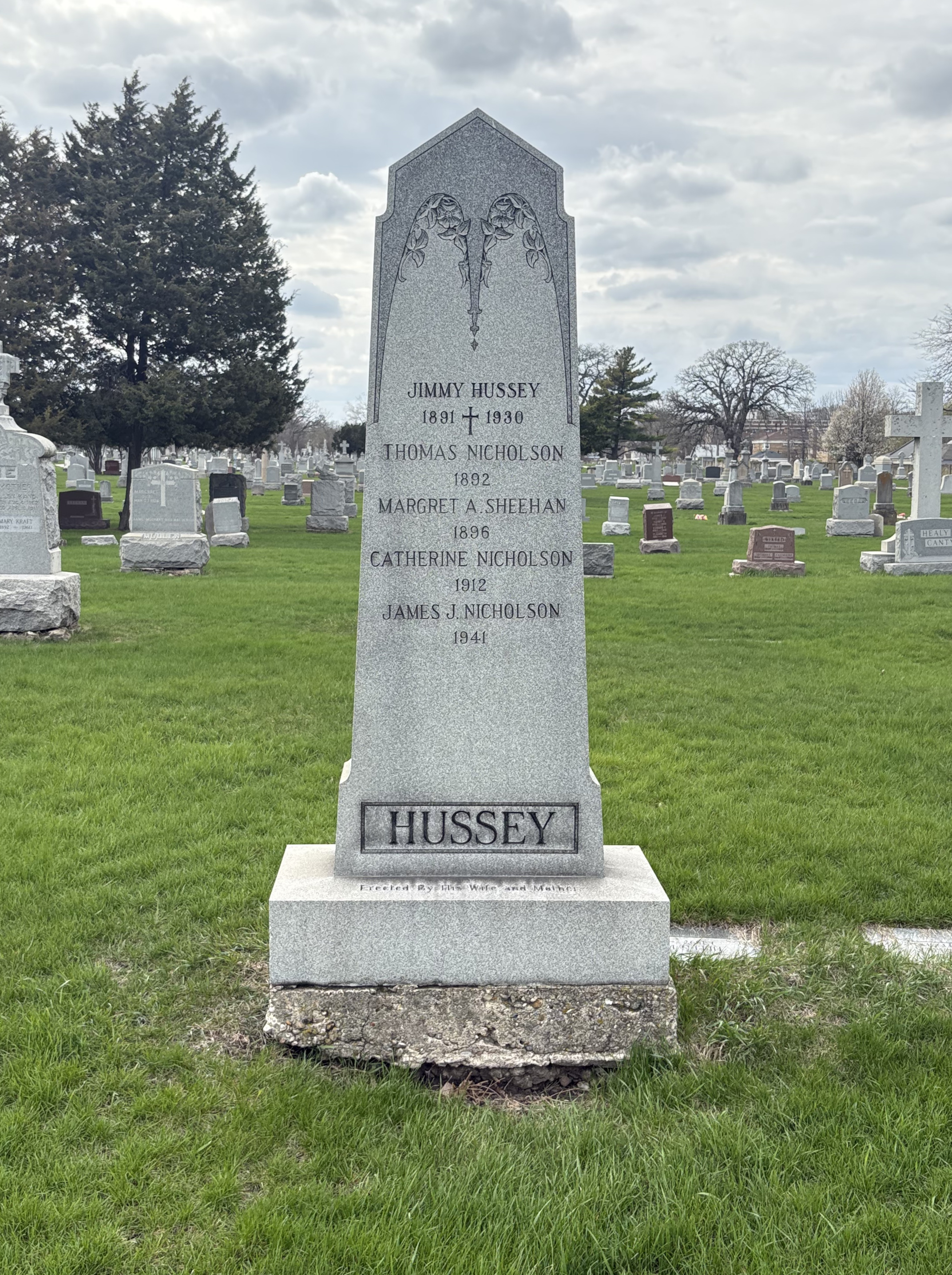
Hussey's grave at Calvary Cemetery

Jimmy Hussey was born Chicago.

He died from pneumonia at his home in North Bergen, New Jersey on November 20, 1930, and was buried at Calvary Cemetery in Evanston.

== Vaudeville shows ==
- Travesty 1919 - military playlette "Somewhere".
- Tattle Tales 1920 - librettist and producer Jimmy Hussey.
- The Whirl of the Town 1921 Shubert musical revue, staged Jimmy Hussey, including Mae West
