= Henri Dreyfus =

Swiss chemist (1882–1944)

- Born: 7 January 1882; Basel, Switzerland
- Died: 30 December 1944 (aged 62)
- Occupation: Chemist
- Known for: Celanese

Henri Dreyfus (or Henry Dreyfus, 7 January 1882 – 30 December 1944) was a Swiss inventor of the modern weaving loom. He and his brother Camille Dreyfus also invented Celanese, an acetate yarn.

== Early years ==
Henri Dreyfus was born in 1882, into a Jewish family, from Basel, Switzerland in 1878. He was the younger brother of Camille Dreyfus (1878–1956). His parents were Abraham and Henrietta (née Wahl) Dreyfus.

Their father was involved in the chemical industry. The brothers both went to school in Basel and then studied at the Sorbonne, Paris. In 1904 Henri Dreyfus earned a PhD from the University of Basel with the highest honors.

The Dreyfus brothers began experimenting in a small laboratory in a corner of the garden of their father's house in Basel. Their first achievement was to develop synthetic indigo dyes. In 1908 they turned to developing cellulose acetate, including scientific investigation of the properties of the compound and commercial exploitation. This would consume the rest of their lives. The initial goal was to create a safe and non-flammable alternative to celluloid, then used for motion pictures and photography. By 1910 they had perfected plastic film and acetate lacquers, or aircraft dope.

On 12 December 1912 Henri and Camille Dreyfus, funded by the entrepreneur Alexander Clavel-Respinger, set up a factory in Basel, Cellonit Gesellschaft Dreyfus & Co., to produce fireproof celluloid from cellulose acetate. The Cellonit company, founded in 1913, was innovative in developing new materials. The Dreyfus brothers produced the first acetate continuous filament yarn in 1913. However, most of the production went in film for motion pictures or toiletry items. The Paris-based Pathé cinema equipment manufacturer became a major customer. The company also made lacquers that were used for German Zeppelins and airplanes. Demand for acetate lacquers grew steadily as the aircraft industry expanded.

== World War I ==
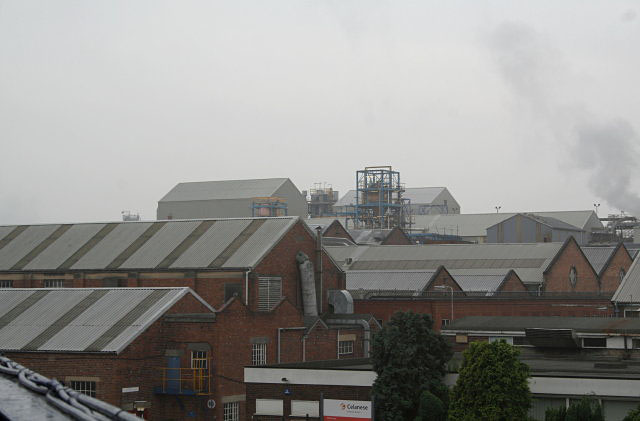
British Celanese factory, Spondon, Derbyshire

During World War I (July 1914 – November 1918) the Cellonite company was the only bidder to respond to a request from the British War Office for manufacture of cellulose acetate dopes in the United Kingdom. Camille and Henri Dreyfus moved to Britain in 1916 to supervise construction of a factory to make the dope, used to coat the fabric skins of airplanes to make them taut, fire-resistant and waterproof. The British Cellulose and Chemical Manufacturing company was established to operate the factory with 160,000 shares, of which the Dreyfus brothers and Alexander Clavel received 79,998, the Prudential Trust of Canada 40,470, Vickers Ltd. 19,800 and the remainder to smaller investors.

The plant was built at Spondon, Derbyshire, by Alfred David McAlpine. A contract for forty tons of lacquer was signed in January 1917, and deliveries finally began in April 1917. There were difficulties meeting demand at first, in part due to shortage of the raw materials. However, the company expanded fast, and moved into other products needed by the aircraft industry. The British Government patented Henri Drefus's process for producing acetic acid anhydride. By 1918, Henri Dreyfus was managing a workforce of 14,000.

== Later career ==
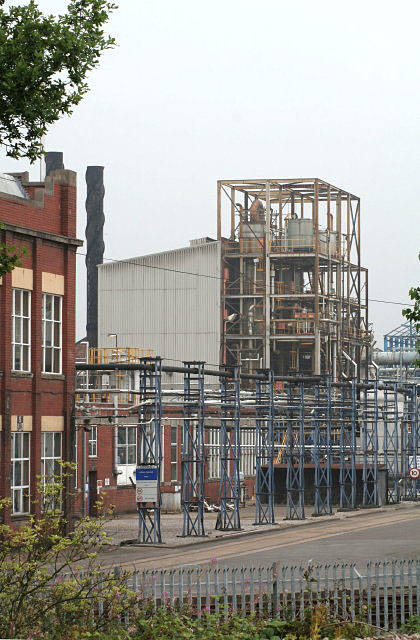
British Celanese acetate factory, Spondon, Derbyshire

With the end of World War I in November 1918 all the lacquer contracts were cancelled and the company had to struggle to survive. Camille Dreyfus had left in February 1918 to set up an American operation, later to become the Celanese Corporation, and did not return until July 1919. The two brothers moved into new cellulose-based products including varnishes, paints and an artificial silk yarn that they called celanese. Spondon had the capacity to make about 1,000 pounds (450 kg) of acetate filament daily when Henri launched the product under the "celanese" brand in 1921.

Henri Dreyfus concentrated on technical development and running the British company for the rest of his life. The British Celanese company went public in 1920. The government acquired £1,450,000 in preferred shares in return for the funding it had supplied, but sold this stake over the next few years. The company changed its name to British Celanese in 1923. The company repeatedly forecast large profits, but did not pay any dividends on its common shares until 1944, when Drayfus died. (Note: In 1944 the Times published a letter commenting that "To die a millionaire and to have failed to pay any dividend to one's ordinary shareholders for two decades is in itself quite an achievement".)

Henri Dreyfus's brother Camille ran the American company, which went public in 1927. Although they were technically independent public companies, in practice the two were both controlled by the Dreyfus brothers, who treated them as parent and subsidiary. Henri was a director of the American company until his death. Henri Dreyfus was effective in promoting his company's products in competition with other artificial fiber manufacturers, notably Courtaulds. A 1930 survey found that 98% of British women were aware of celanese.

Because both methanol and carbon monoxide are commodity raw materials, methanol carbonylation long appeared to be attractive precursors to acetic acid. Henri Dreyfus developed a methanol carbonylation pilot plant at British Celanese as early as 1925. However, a lack of practical materials that could contain the corrosive reaction mixture at the high pressures needed (200 atm or more) discouraged commercialization.

Patents were awarded for many important inventions such as disperse dying and the dry-spinning process. British Celanese sued Courtaulds for infringement of acetate patents in 1931, then filed a series of appeals that eventually reached the House of Lords, which rejected the claim. They sued again in 1936 and lost again in 1937. The appeal against this decision was withdrawn when the two companies began merger talks. They reached agreement on a merger in 1939, but the deal was incomplete when World War II (1939–1945) broke out. They were not resumed in Dreyfus's lifetime.

Henri Dreyfus died in 1944. During his life he had filed more than 2,000 patent applications. In 1946 Camille Dreyfus set up the Henry Dreyfus Foundation in memory of his brother, "to advance the science of chemistry, chemical engineering and related sciences as a means of improving human relations and circumstances around the world."
